= Ovens & Murray Football Netball League =

Australian rules football and netball competition

- Formerly: List: Ovens And Murray Football Association (1893–1910); Rutherglen And District Football Association (1911–1913); Ovens And Murray Football Association (1914–1925); Ovens And Murray Football League (1926–1992); Ovens And Murray Football Netball League (1993–present)
- Sport: Football (1893–present); Netball (1993–present)
- Founded: 1893; 133 years ago in Rutherglen, Victoria
- President: David Sinclair
- No. of teams: 10
- Country: Australia
- Confederation: AFL Victoria Country (2012–present); Netball Victoria (1993–present)
- Most recent champion: Wangaratta Rovers (18) (2026)
- Most titles: Albury (22)
- Level on pyramid: 3

The Ovens and Murray Football Netball League (OMFNL or O&MFNL) is an Australian rules football and netball competition containing ten clubs based in north-eastern Victoria, the southern Riverina region of New South Wales and the Ovens and Murray area. The name comes from the Ovens River, the river in the part of north-eastern Victoria covered by the league, and the Murray River, which separates Victoria and New South Wales.

The league features three grades in the Australian rules football competition, with these being Seniors, Reserve-Grade and Under 18s. In the netball competition, there are four grades, with these being A-Grade, B-Grade, C-Grade and Under 16s.

Currently a home and away season consisting of eighteen rounds is played. The best five teams then play off according to the McIntyre system, culminating in the O&MFNL Grand Final, which from 1995 to 2017 was held at the Lavington Sports Ground in the Albury suburb of Hamilton Valley.

== History ==
=== Beginnings of the O&MFA ===
Organised competition in the area started as the "Ovens & Murray Football Association" in 1893, with the following foundation clubs – Beechworth Wanderers, Chiltern, Eldorado, Rutherglen, Wangaratta City and Wangaratta West End, with Beechworth Football Club winning premierships in 1893 and 1894 and Rutherglen winning thirteen O&MFA flags between 1895 and 1915.

In 1910, the O&MFA had only three teams – Albury, Excelsior and Rutherglen, with Rutherglen winning the premiership.

In 1911, both Excelsior and Rutherglen applied to enter the Rutherglen and District Football Association. As a result, the O&MFL folded, with local teams attempting to apply to play in the Rutherglen & DFA. A ballot took place at a Rutherglen & DFA meeting on 29 April at Mackay's Hotel, Rutherglen which resulted in Balldale, North Albury, Rutherglen, South Albury and Wodonga being refused admission to join the association. Corowa, Excelsior and Lake Rovers were club's that were admitted. In 1911, the Albury Football Club was planning to divide the club into South Albury and North Albury teams, but as they were not admitted into the Rutherglen & DFA, the club went into recess in 1911. Rutherglen FC also went into recess in 1911.

Albury FC and Rutherglen FC were admitted into the Rutherglen & DFA in 1912.

In 1913, the Rutherglen & DFA consisting of the following teams – Albury, Balldale, Border United, Howlong, Lake Rovers and Rutherglen, with Albury defeating Rutherglen in the grand final at the Albury Sportground.

The competition reformed under the Ovens & Murray Football Association banner again in 1914, involving the following five teams: Albury, Border United, Howlong, Lake Rovers and Rutherglen. Balldale FC entered the Coreen & District Football League in 1914.

In 1915, Beechworth Football Club and Wangaratta Football Club returned to play in the O&MFA. Howlong Football Club entered the Chiltern & District Football Association and went onto win the premiership, while Rutherglen defeated Lake Rovers in the O&MFA grand final played at Rutherglen.

After a three-year break due to World War I, the O&MFA reformed for the 1919 season with only four clubs, Border United Football Club (Corowa based), Howlong, Lake Rovers and Rutherglen. Albury Football Club was reformed in early 1919 and played in the Albury Senior Football Association with two teams – South Albury and North Albury, with St. Patrick's FC defeating South Albury Football Club in the grand final on the Albury Sportsground.

In 1920 the O&MFA did not reform; "It seems strange that the O&MFA has apparently been allowed to die a natural death" with only two clubs present at the O&MFA – AGM, with some clubs moving to play in the Chiltern & DFA and Coreen & DFA.

The competition reformed in 1921 with Lakes Rovers, Rutherglen, St Patricks, Corowa, Springhurst and Wahgunyah. In 1922, larger town clubs Benalla and Wangaratta joined the OMFA whilst Wahgunyah and Springhurst moved to the Chiltern DFL.

In 1924, Lake Rovers Football Club amalgamated with the Rutherglen Football Club. Albury FC and the Diggers FC also decided to amalgamate in 1924 and apply for admission into the Ovens and Murray Football League as Albury Football Club.

In 1926, the O&M name was changed from an association to a league, its present form. Around this time the clubs contesting the league included Wangaratta, Hume Weir (which drew many of its players from workers constructing the Hume Dam at the time), Yarrawonga and two clubs from the town of Albury, St Patricks and Albury club). These two clubs were largely divided amongst sectarian lines, St Patricks being Roman Catholic and Albury being Protestant and, after much tension, in 1929 the two clubs agreed to disband and form two new clubs, East Albury Football Club and West Albury Football Club, with the player base to be drawn geographically.

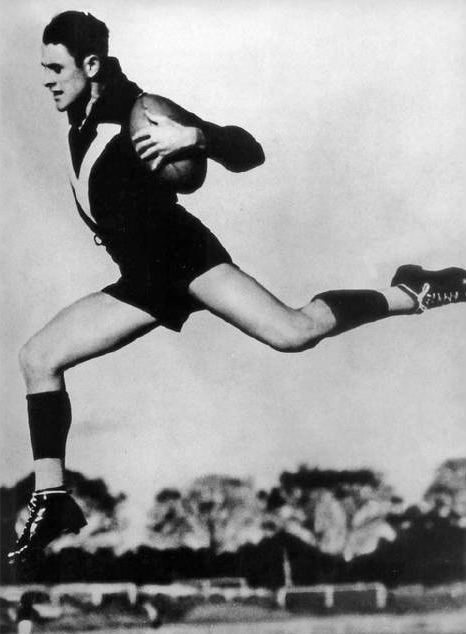
Haydn Bunton in a photo that became the basis of a statue outside the Melbourne Cricket Ground

ollowing the 1930 season, a 19 year old West Albury player, Haydn Bunton, who has sometimes been described as the best ever player of Australian rules, was recruited by VFL club Fitzroy. Bunton won Brownlow Medals in 1931, 1932 and 1935, before transferring to Subiaco in the WANFL, where he won Sandover Medals in 1938, 1939 and 1941. Bunton has remained one of only four triple Brownlow medallists, and the only player to have been awarded three Brownlows and three Sandovers. (Bunton Park, where North Albury Football Club is based, was named after his brother Cleaver Bunton, who was elected president of the O&MFL in 1930 and would serve in that role until 1969. Cleaver Bunton was also mayor of Albury for 30 years.)

In 1930 Hume Weir Football Club and Ebden Rovers Football Club merged to become the Weir United Football Club.

East Albury Football Club and Weir United Football Club merged in 1933 to become the Border United Football Club (Albury based) and wore green and white jumpers. In 1933 West Albury Football Club changed its name to the Albury Football Club and remained in the West Albury colours of maroon and blue.

At the O&MFA's 1936 Annual General Meeting, it was announced that the Border United FC would merge with the Albury Football Club as both clubs were in debt and also due to a lack of players. The newly merged team took on the name of the Albury Football Club. This left the City of Albury with only one football team.

=== Post-World War II ===
In 1940, the league went into recess after round 10 for the duration of World War II, before full competition resumed in 1946. In 1945, Rutherglen, played in the Chiltern & District Football Association and Wodonga played in the Albury Border Football Association in 1945. In 1947 North Albury was admitted, followed by Wangaratta Rovers and Myrtleford, who were admitted from the Ovens & King Football League in 1950. Wangaratta won four consecutive premierships between 1949 and 1953, under captain coach, Mac Holten.

The Wangaratta Rovers would go on to dominate the O&M for the remainder of the 20th Century, winning fifteen premierships to date, a number only recently overhauled by Albury with their own streak of flags.

Throughout the 1950s and 1960s the league began to gain a reputation within Victoria as being the strongest competition outside the then VFL and VFA. The best players were often recruited from the O&M to play for one of the "city" clubs, but it was not uncommon for a VFL player to retire from the "big" league and play in the O&M or another country league, and perhaps start a coaching career there as well, often at the same time as a playing coach. One notable example of this, as far as the O&M was concerned, was Bob Rose, who left Collingwood as a player in 1955 and became captain coach of the Wangaratta Rovers and lead them to two premierships in 1958 and 1960, after which he returned to Collingwood to continue his coaching career.

=== 1970s and 1980s ===
In 1968, the VFL introduced country recruitment zones throughout Victoria and Riverina, which limited the areas from which each VFL club could recruit. The O&MFL was allocated to North Melbourne, and thus quite a few of the better players from the O&M came to play for the Kangaroos, contributing in part to that club's rise to success in the 1970s. These included Mick Nolan, Xavier Tanner, Gary Cowton, Peter Chisnall and John Byrne and later John Longmire, who had a good season with Corowa-Rutherglen as a goal kicking forward in O&M seniors in 1987. The zoning system was discontinued in the late 1980s as the VFL/AFL introduced a draft system.

The Wangaratta Rovers dominated the 1970s, playing in ten grand finals between 1970 and 1980, winning seven premierships and finishing third in 1973.

In 1974 the O&MFL was disaffiliated by the Victorian Country Football League (VCFL) when the O&MFL refused to accept an application from the Lavington Football Club to join the league. By this stage the football club was based at the Lavington Sports Club, an established licensed club, and was strong enough to field teams in both the Tallangatta League and Hume Football League the following year.

The makeup of the competition remained stable until 1979, when Corowa and Rutherglen merged into Corowa-Rutherglen, and the Lavington Football Club was finally admitted from the Farrer Football League, so the number of clubs remained at ten.

Lavington's home ground, the Lavington Sports Club Oval, provided an ideal venue for many sports as the sports club gradually developed it after its construction in the 1970s. The league has designated it as the venue for most of the league's grand finals since the 1980s. Recently, added assistance for the staging of the grand final through regional promotion and in-kind sponsorship has been provided by the Albury City Council.

In 1983, after an unsuccessful debut season playing for Hawthorn the previous year, Gary Ablett played for Myrtleford in the O&M for a year, before he was recruited by Geelong where he recommenced his career in the VFL/AFL and established himself as one of the code's best players, being inducted into the Australian Football Hall of Fame in 2005.

By the late 1980s, the Wodonga Demons of the Tallangatta League had made a number of bids to join the O&M, and in 1989 were accepted into the competition to serve the west of the city of Wodonga, based at Birralee Park. They changed their name to the Wodonga Raiders Football Club so as to not cause confusion with the Benalla Demons and the long established Wodonga Football Club.

=== 1990 "Bloodbath" Grand Final ===
Around a minute after the start of the 1990 grand final between Lavington and Wodonga, a brawl began players, which lasted for around three minutes. Fifteen players received a combined total of 68 matches in suspensions following the match − a combined 46 for Lavington players and 22 for Wodonga players.

Footage of the brawls, which was broadcast live Prime Television, was shown across Australia and around the world, and it has been described as the OMFL's "darkest day".

Wodonga won the match by 20 points, despite having trailed at the first three breaks, marking the club's fifth senior premiership. This was the second premiership for Jeff Gieschen as Wodonga coach, having coached the club to a victory in 1987, and he later went on to coach West Perth and Richmond.

=== Recent years ===
In 1998, after a string of unsuccessful seasons in the O&M, Benalla moved to the Goulburn Valley Football League. In 2000 the Penrith Panthers Leagues Club, financiers of the Penrith Panthers National Rugby League team, merged with the Lavington Sports Club. As a result, the Lavington Football Club changed their nickname from the Blues to the Panthers, added "Panthers" to their title, and adopted a guernsey in the same colours as the NRL Panthers, but in the Port Adelaide AFL pattern.

Also around this time, the Wagga Tigers Football Club, which had dominated the Riverina Football League, made a bid to join the O&MFL; however, partially due to concerns from the league's southern clubs about travel times, the bid was rejected. The Wagga Tigers then successfully bid to join AFL Canberra.

In 2000 the O&MFL, in an association with the AFL North Melbourne Football Club, fielded a team in the Victorian Football League called the Murray Kangaroos, playing home games between Coburg and Lavington. However, due to concerns from O&M clubs about player availability, the Kangaroos about travel time, and poor attendances compared with O&M league games, the venture was discontinued after three seasons and the Kangaroos subsequently set up an affiliation with the established VFL club Port Melbourne.

The league operates with a $125,000 salary cap. The Wangaratta Magpies exceeded this in 2022, and the club was stripped of its 2022 premiership flag, a first in country football, among other penalties.

== Clubs ==
=== Current clubs ===
Club	Colours	Moniker	Home ground(s)	Former league	Established	Joined O&M	Senior flags	Most recent
Albury		Tigers	Albury Sportsground, Albury	–	1876	1896	22	2018
Corowa-Rutherglen		Roos	John Foord Oval (Note: Played at the Barkly Park on few occasions.), Corowa	–	1979 (Note: From the merger of Corowa + Rutherglen clubs.)	1979	2	2003
Lavington		Panthers	Lavington Sports Ground, Hamilton Valley	FFL	1880s	1979	5	2019
Myrtleford		Saints	McNamara Reserve, Myrtleford	O&KFL	1896	1950	1	1970
North Albury		Hoppers	Bunton Park, North Albury	CDFL	1943	1947	6	2002
Wangaratta		Magpies	Norm Minns Oval, Wangaratta	O&KFL	1877	1893	15	2017
Wangaratta Rovers		Hawks	W.J. Findlay Oval, Wangaratta	O&KFL	1922	1950	18	2026
Wodonga		Bulldogs	Martin Park, Wodonga	CDFL	1878	1936	7	2004
Wodonga Raiders		Raiders	Birallee Park, West Wodonga	TDFL	1953 (Note: As Kergunyah FC.)	1989	1	1998
Yarrawonga		Pigeons	J.C. Lowe Oval. (Note: The club has also used the Lonsdale Reserve in few occasions.), Yarrawonga	BMFL	1889	1929	6	2023

=== Former clubs ===
Club	Color	Moniker	Home ground(s)	Former league	Estab.	Years in O&M	Flags	Fate
Balldale			Balldale Cricket Ground, Balldale	CDFA	1906	1909, 1912–1913	0	Moved to Coreen & District FA in 1914
Barnawartha		Tigers	Havelock Street Recreation Reserve, Barnawartha	–	1894	1911	0	Moved to Chiltern & District FA in 1920
Beechworth		Bombers	Baarmutha Park, Beechworth	O&KFL	1861	1893–1898, 1900–1902, 1907, 1915, 1924–1928	3	Moved to Ovens & King FL in 1916 and 1929
Benalla		Demons	Benalla Showgrounds, Benalla	EDFA	1896	1922–1928, 1946–1997	4	Moved to Goulburn Valley FL in 1998
Benalla Rovers		Rovers	Benalla Show Grounds, Benalla	–	1920	1929-1930	0	Absorbed by Benalla in 1931
Border United (Corowa / Wahgunyah)			Morris Park, Corowa	–	1876	1895–1905, 1913–1915, 1919, 1946–1947	0	De-merged into Corowa and Wahgunyah after 1905, 1915, 1919 and 1947
Border United (East Albury / Weir United)		Greens	Albury Sportsground, Albury	–	1933	1933–1935	1	Absorbed by Albury in 1936
Chiltern		Swans	Chiltern Football Ground, Chiltern	–	1906	1893–1903, 1906–1908	0	Moved to Chiltern & District FA in 1912
Corowa		Spiders	John Foord Oval, Corowa	–	1877	1908–1912, 1921–1940, 1948–1978	2	Merged with Rutherglen to form Corowa-Rutherglen in 1979
East Albury		Rovers	Alexandra Park, East Albury	–	1929	1929–1932	0	Merged back into Albury in 1933, also merged with Weir United to form Border United
Eldorado			Eldorado Recreation Reserve, Eldorado	–		1893	0	Moved to Ovens & King FL
Excelsior		Magpies	The Freehold, Rutherglen	–	1908	1896–1906, 1908–1912	1	Folded
Great Southern			Southern Ground, Rutherglen	–	1898	1898–1902, 1905–1907	0	Moved to Chiltern & District FA in 1912
Howlong		Spiders	Howlong Oval, Howlong	C&DFA	1898	1911–1914, 1919	1	Moved to Chiltern & District FA in 1920
Hume Weir		Magpies	Wodonga Racecourse, Wodonga	A&BFA	1921	1924–1929	0	Merged with Ebden Rovers to form Weir United in 1930
Lake Moodemere		Rovers	Lake Moodemere Recreation Reserve, Rutherglen	–		1903–1906, 1909–1910	2	Merged with Rutherglen in 1907
Lake Rovers		Rovers	Barkly Park, Rutherglen	CDFL	1911	1911–1915, 1919, 1921–1923	0	Merged with Rutherglen in 1924
Lilliput			Lilliput Recreation Reserve, Lilliput	–	1889	1894	0	Folded
Rutherglen (1893)		Redlegs	Barkly Park, Rutherglen	–	1893	1893–1910, 1912–1915, 1919, 1921–1978	15	Merged with Corowa to form Corowa-Rutherglen in 1979
South Albury			Waites Park, South Albury	–		1898–1907	0	Folded
Springhurst			Springhurst Recreation Reserve, Springhurst	CDFL	1893	1921	0	Moved to Chiltern & District FA in 1922
St. Patrick's (Albury)		Saints	Xavier High School Oval, North Albury	–	1919	1921–1929	6	Folded, still compete as a junior club
United Miners		Gold Seekers	Prentice Freehold Mine, Rutherglen	–	1894	1894–1895, 1911–1912	0	Moved to Chiltern & District FA in 1913
Wahgunyah			Wahgunyah Football Ground, Wahgunyah	CDFL	1908	1908, 1921	0	Moved to Chiltern & District FA in 1922
Weir United		Westerners	Hume Dam, Lake Hume Village	–	1930	1930–1932	2	Merged with East Albury to form Border United in 1933
West Albury			Uiver Park, West Albury	–		1929–1932	1	Merged back into Albury in 1933
West End (Wangaratta)			Wareena Park, Wangaratta	–	1892	1893	0	Folded

Notes

The club monikers listed above for former clubs are the ones they currently use and may not be their monikers used when playing in the Ovens and Murray league.

Club mergers

- 1877: Corowa FC & Wahgunyah FC merged between 1877 & 1905, then 1914 & 1919, and 1944 & 1947 and were known as Border United FC (Corowa based).
- 1907: Lake Moodemere and Rutherglen FC merged just prior to the start of the 1907 O&MFA season and were then known as Rutherglen FC.
- 1924: Albury FC and the Diggers FC merge and apply for admission into the Ovens and Murray Football League as Albury FC.
- 1924: Lake Rovers Football Club amalgamated with the Rutherglen Football Club and be known as Rutherglen FC.
- 1929: Benalla FC and Benalla Rovers FC merged to become Benalla Rovers FC, before changing back to Benalla FC in 1931.
- 1930: Hume Weir Football Club and Ebden Rovers Football Club merged to become the Weir United Football Club.
- 1930: Wangaratta FC (O&MFL) and Wangaratta Rovers FC (O&KFL) merged in 1930 and entered one team in the O&MFL & another team in the O&KFL. Wangaratta Rovers reformed as a stand-alone club in 1945 and entered a team in the O&KFL, before joining the O&MFL in 1950.
- 1933: East Albury Football Club and Weir United Football Club merge to become the Border United Football Club (Albury based) and wore green and white jumpers.
- 1933: West Albury Football Club changed its name to the Albury Football Club and remained in the West Albury colours of maroon and blue.
- 1936: Border United FC would merge with the Albury Football Club and be known as Albury FC.
- 1979: Corowa FC and Rutherglen FC merge to become Corowa / Rutherglen FC.

== League honour boards ==
=== Premierships ===
Premiers: Year by year

Season	Seniors^{(football 1893–)}	Reserves^{(football 1953–)}	Thirds^{(football 1973–)}	A Grade^{(netball 1993–)}	B Grade^{(netball 1993–)}	C Grade^{(netball 1996–)}	D Grade^{(netball 2012–)}	E Grade^{(netball 2023–)}
**Ovens & Murray Football Association (1893–1910)**
1893	Beechworth ^{(1)}	—	—	—	—	—	—	—
1894	Beechworth ^{(2)}	—	—	—	—	—	—	—
1895	Rutherglen ^{(1)}	—	—	—	—	—	—	—
1896	Rutherglen ^{(2)}	—	—	—	—	—	—	—
1897	Beechworth ^{(3)}	—	—	—	—	—	—	—
1898	Rutherglen ^{(3)}	—	—	—	—	—	—	—
1899	Rutherglen ^{(4)}	—	—	—	—	—	—	—
1900	Excelsior ^{(1)}	—	—	—	—	—	—	—
1901	Rutherglen ^{(5)}	—	—	—	—	—	—	—
1902	Albury ^{(1)}	—	—	—	—	—	—	—
1903	Rutherglen ^{(6)}	—	—	—	—	—	—	—
1904	Rutherglen ^{(7)}	—	—	—	—	—	—	—
1905	Lake Moodemere ^{(1)}	—	—	—	—	—	—	—
1906	Lake Moodemere ^{(2)}	—	—	—	—	—	—	—
1907	Rutherglen ^{(8)}	—	—	—	—	—	—	—
1908	Albury ^{(2)}	—	—	—	—	—	—	—
1909	Rutherglen ^{(9)}	—	—	—	—	—	—	—
1910	Rutherglen ^{(10)}	—	—	—	—	—	—	—
**Rutherglen & District Football Association (1911–1913)**
1911	Howlong ^{(1)}	—	—	—	—	—	—	—
1912	Rutherglen ^{(11)}	—	—	—	—	—	—	—
1913	Albury ^{(3)}	—	—	—	—	—	—	—
**Ovens & Murray Football Association (1914–1925)**
1914	Rutherglen ^{(12)}	—	—	—	—	—	—	—
1915	Rutherglen ^{(13)}	—	—	—	—	—	—	—
1916	**Association in recess (World War I)**							
1917	**Association in recess (World War I)**							
1918	**Association in recess (World War I)**							
1919	Lake Rovers ^{(1)}	—	—	—	—	—	—	—
1920	**Association in recess (only two clubs)**							
1921	St Patricks ^{(1)}	—	—	—	—	—	—	—
1922	St Patricks ^{(2)}	—	—	—	—	—	—	—
1923	St Patricks ^{(3)}	—	—	—	—	—	—	—
1924	St Patricks ^{(4)}	—	—	—	—	—	—	—
1925	Wangaratta ^{(1)}	—	—	—	—	—	—	—
**Ovens & Murray Football League (1926–1992)**
1926	St Patricks ^{(5)}	—	—	—	—	—	—	—
1927	St Patricks ^{(6)}	—	—	—	—	—	—	—
1928	Albury ^{(4)}	—	—	—	—	—	—	—
1929	West Albury ^{(1)}	—	—	—	—	—	—	—
1930	Weir United ^{(1)}	—	—	—	—	—	—	—
1931	Weir United ^{(2)}	—	—	—	—	—	—	—
1932	Corowa ^{(1)}	—	—	—	—	—	—	—
1933	Wangaratta ^{(2)}	—	—	—	—	—	—	—
1934	Border United ^{(1)} E.A.-W.U.	—	—	—	—	—	—	—
1935	Rutherglen ^{(14)}	—	—	—	—	—	—	—
1936	Wangaratta ^{(3)}	—	—	—	—	—	—	—
1937	Albury ^{(5)}	—	—	—	—	—	—	—
1938	Wangaratta ^{(4)}	—	—	—	—	—	—	—
1939	Albury ^{(6)}	—	—	—	—	—	—	—
1940	Albury ^{(7)}	—	—	—	—	—	—	—
1941	**League in recess (World War II)**							
1942	**League in recess (World War II)**							
1943	**League in recess (World War II)**							
1944	**League in recess (World War II)**							
1945	**League in recess (World War II)**							
1946	Wangaratta ^{(5)}	—	—	—	—	—	—	—
1947	Albury ^{(8)}	—	—	—	—	—	—	—
1948	North Albury ^{(1)}	—	—	—	—	—	—	—
1949	Wangaratta ^{(6)}	—	—	—	—	—	—	—
1950	Wangaratta ^{(7)}	—	—	—	—	—	—	—
1951	Wangaratta ^{(8)}	—	—	—	—	—	—	—
1952	Wangaratta ^{(9)}	—	—	—	—	—	—	—
1953	Benalla ^{(1)}	Corowa ^{(1)}	—	—	—	—	—	—
1954	Rutherglen ^{(15)}	North Albury ^{(1)}	—	—	—	—	—	—
1955	North Albury ^{(2)}	Benalla ^{(1)}	—	—	—	—	—	—
1956	Albury ^{(9)}	Wodonga ^{(1)}	—	—	—	—	—	—
1957	Wangaratta ^{(10)}	Wodonga ^{(2)}	—	—	—	—	—	—
1958	Wang. Rovers ^{(1)}	Wang. Rovers ^{(1)}	—	—	—	—	—	—
1959	Yarrawonga ^{(1)}	Wangaratta ^{(1)}	—	—	—	—	—	—
1960	Wang. Rovers ^{(2)}	Wodonga ^{(3)}	—	—	—	—	—	—
1961	Wangaratta ^{(11)}	Wodonga ^{(4)}	—	—	—	—	—	—
1962	Benalla ^{(2)}	Wangaratta ^{(2)}	—	—	—	—	—	—
1963	Benalla ^{(3)}	Myrtleford ^{(1)}	—	—	—	—	—	—
1964	Wang. Rovers ^{(3)}	Yarrawonga ^{(1)}	—	—	—	—	—	—
1965	Wang. Rovers ^{(4)}	Albury ^{(1)}	—	—	—	—	—	—
1966	Albury ^{(10)}	Myrtleford ^{(2)}	—	—	—	—	—	—
1967	Wodonga ^{(1)}	Wangaratta ^{(3)}	—	—	—	—	—	—
1968	Corowa ^{(2)}	Wangaratta ^{(4)}	—	—	—	—	—	—
1969	Wodonga ^{(2)}	Wodonga ^{(5)}	—	—	—	—	—	—
1970	Myrtleford ^{(1)}	Wodonga ^{(6)}	—	—	—	—	—	—
1971	Wang. Rovers ^{(5)}	Wodonga ^{(7)}	—	—	—	—	—	—
1972	Wang. Rovers ^{(6)}	Benalla ^{(2)}	—	—	—	—	—	—
1973	Benalla ^{(4)}	Yarrawonga ^{(2)}	Albury ^{(1)}	—	—	—	—	—
1974	Wang. Rovers ^{(7)}	Yarrawonga ^{(3)}	Benalla ^{(1)}	—	—	—	—	—
1975	Wang. Rovers ^{(8)}	Yarrawonga ^{(4)}	Wangaratta ^{(1)}	—	—	—	—	—
1976	Wangaratta ^{(12)}	Wang. Rovers ^{(2)}	Wangaratta ^{(2)}	—	—	—	—	—
1977	Wang. Rovers ^{(9)}	Wang. Rovers ^{(3)}	Wodonga ^{(1)}	—	—	—	—	—
1978	Wang. Rovers ^{(10)}	Benalla ^{(3)}	Wodonga ^{(2)}	—	—	—	—	—
1979	Wang. Rovers ^{(11)}	Wodonga ^{(8)}	Wodonga ^{(3)}	—	—	—	—	—
1980	North Albury ^{(3)}	Wang. Rovers ^{(4)}	Wang. Rovers ^{(1)}	—	—	—	—	—
1981	Wodonga ^{(3)}	Wodonga ^{(9)}	Wodonga ^{(4)}	—	—	—	—	—
1982	Albury ^{(11)}	Lavington ^{(1)}	Wodonga ^{(5)}	—	—	—	—	—
1983	Lavington ^{(1)}	Wang. Rovers ^{(5)}	Cor.-R'glen ^{(1)}	—	—	—	—	—
1984	North Albury ^{(4)}	Wang. Rovers ^{(6)}	Cor.-R'glen ^{(2)}	—	—	—	—	—
1985	Albury ^{(12)}	Wangaratta ^{(5)}	Wang. Rovers ^{(2)}	—	—	—	—	—
1986	Lavington ^{(2)}	Cor.-R'glen ^{(1)}	Wodonga ^{(6)}	—	—	—	—	—
1987	Wodonga ^{(4)}	Wodonga ^{(10)}	Wodonga ^{(7)}	—	—	—	—	—
1988	Wang. Rovers ^{(12)}	Yarrawonga ^{(5)}	Wang. Rovers ^{(3)}	—	—	—	—	—
1989	Yarrawonga ^{(2)}	Wodonga ^{(11)}	Wod. Raiders ^{(1)}	—	—	—	—	—
1990	Wodonga ^{(5)}	Wodonga ^{(12)}	Myrtleford ^{(1)}	—	—	—	—	—
1991	Wang. Rovers ^{(13)}	Wod. Raiders ^{(1)}	Wodonga ^{(8)}	—	—	—	—	—
1992	Wodonga ^{(6)}	Cor.-R'glen ^{(2)}	Wangaratta ^{(3)}	—	—	—	—	—
**Ovens & Murray Football League / Ovens & Murray Netball Association (1993–2008)**
1993	Wang. Rovers ^{(14)}	Wodonga ^{(13)}	Lavington ^{(1)}	Wang. Rovers ^{(1)}	Cor.-R'glen ^{(1)}	—	—	—
1994	Wang. Rovers ^{(15)}	Wodonga ^{(14)}	Wod. Raiders ^{(2)}	Wang. Rovers ^{(2)}	North Albury ^{(1)}	—	—	—
1995	Albury ^{(13)}	Wodonga ^{(15)}	Wang. Rovers ^{(4)}	Myrtleford ^{(1)}	Cor.-R'glen ^{(2)}	—	—	—
1996	Albury ^{(14)}	Albury ^{(2)}	Wang. Rovers ^{(5)}	North Albury ^{(1)}	North Albury ^{(2)}	Wang. Rovers ^{(1)}	—	—
1997	Albury ^{(15)}	Wod. Raiders ^{(2)}	Benalla ^{(2)}	Myrtleford ^{(2)}	Yarrawonga ^{(1)}	Lavington ^{(1)}	—	—
1998	Wod. Raiders ^{(1)}	Wod. Raiders ^{(2)}	Wang. Rovers ^{(6)}	Lavington ^{(1)}	North Albury ^{(3)}	Albury ^{(1)}	—	—
1999	North Albury ^{(5)}	Wod. Raiders ^{(3)}	Wang. Rovers ^{(7)}	North Albury ^{(2)}	Wang. Rovers ^{(1)}	Yarrawonga ^{(1)}	—	—
2000	Cor.-R'glen ^{(1)}	North Albury ^{(2)}	Cor.-R'glen ^{(3)}	Myrtleford ^{(3)}	Albury ^{(1)}	Albury ^{(2)}	—	—
2001	Lavington ^{(3)}	Wodonga ^{(16)}	Wodonga ^{(9)}	Yarrawonga ^{(1)}	Yarrawonga ^{(2)}	North Albury ^{(1)}	—	—
2002	North Albury ^{(6)}	Wod. Raiders ^{(4)}	Wang. Rovers ^{(8)}	Wodonga ^{(1)}	Myrtleford ^{(1)}	North Albury ^{(2)}	—	—
2003	Cor.-R'glen ^{(2)}	Wod. Raiders ^{(5)}	Wang. Rovers ^{(9)}	Myrtleford ^{(4)}	Yarrawonga ^{(3)}	Albury ^{(3)}	—	—
2004	Wodonga ^{(7)}	Wodonga ^{(17)}	Wodonga ^{(9)}	Wodonga ^{(2)}	Yarrawonga ^{(4)}	North Albury ^{(3)}	—	—
2005	Lavington ^{(4)}	Wodonga ^{(18)}	Wodonga ^{(10)}	Wang. Rovers ^{(3)}	Wodonga ^{(1)}	North Albury ^{(4)}	—	—
2006	Yarrawonga ^{(3)}	Wodonga ^{(19)}	Wodonga ^{(11)}	Wang. Rovers ^{(4)}	North Albury ^{(4)}	North Albury ^{(5)}	—	—
2007	Wangaratta ^{(13)}	Wang. Rovers ^{(7)}	Wodonga ^{(12)}	North Albury ^{(3)}	Wodonga ^{(2)}	North Albury ^{(6)}	—	—
2008	Wangaratta ^{(14)}	Albury ^{(3)}	Wang. Rovers ^{(10)}	North Albury ^{(4)}	Myrtleford ^{(2)}	North Albury ^{(7)}	—	—
**Ovens & Murray Football Netball League (2009–)**
2009	Albury ^{(16)}	Albury ^{(4)}	Lavington ^{(2)}	Yarrawonga ^{(2)}	Yarrawonga ^{(5)}	Wangaratta ^{(1)}	—	—
2010	Albury ^{(17)}	Albury ^{(5)}	Wod. Raiders ^{(3)}	Yarrawonga ^{(3)}	Albury ^{(2)}	North Albury ^{(8)}	—	—
2011	Albury ^{(18)}	Yarrawonga ^{(6)}	Wangaratta ^{(4)}	Yarrawonga ^{(4)}	Albury ^{(3)}	North Albury ^{(9)}	—	—
2012	Yarrawonga ^{(4)}	Yarrawonga ^{(7)}	Wangaratta ^{(5)}	Yarrawonga ^{(5)}	North Albury ^{(5)}	Wangaratta ^{(2)}	North Albury ^{(1)}	—
2013	Yarrawonga ^{(5)}	Albury ^{(6)}	Albury ^{(2)}	Lavington ^{(2)}	North Albury ^{(6)}	Albury ^{(4)}	Lavington ^{(1)}	—
2014	Albury ^{(19)}	Albury ^{(7)}	Wangaratta ^{(6)}	Yarrawonga ^{(6)}	North Albury ^{(7)}	Lavington ^{(2)}	North Albury ^{(2)}	—
2015	Albury ^{(20)}	Lavington ^{(2)}	Wangaratta ^{(7)}	Wodonga ^{(3)}	North Albury ^{(8)}	Lavington ^{(3)}	North Albury ^{(3)}	—
2016	Albury ^{(21)}	Yarrawonga ^{(8)}	Yarrawonga ^{(1)}	Yarrawonga ^{(7)}	Yarrawonga ^{(6)}	North Albury ^{(10)}	Wangaratta ^{(1)}	—
2017	Wangaratta ^{(15)}	Wod. Raiders ^{(6)}	Albury ^{(3)}	Yarrawonga ^{(8)}	North Albury ^{(9)}	Lavington ^{(4)}	Yarrawonga ^{(1)}	—
2018	Albury ^{(22)}	Yarrawonga ^{(9)}	Wang. Rovers ^{(11)}	Wangaratta ^{(1)}	Wangaratta ^{(1)}	North Albury ^{(11)}	North Albury ^{(4)}	—
2019	Lavington ^{(5)}	Yarrawonga ^{(10)}	Myrtleford ^{(2)}	Wangaratta ^{(2)}	Cor.-R'glen ^{(3)}	Yarrawonga ^{(2)}	Wang. Rovers ^{(1)}	—
2020	**League in recess (COVID-19)**							
2021	**Season abandoned (COVID-19)**							
2022	Withheld ^{(a)}	Yarrawonga ^{(11)}	Wangaratta ^{(8)}	Yarrawonga ^{(9)}	Lavington ^{(1)}	Lavington ^{(5)}	Wodonga ^{(1)}	—
2023	Yarrawonga ^{(6)}	Albury ^{(8)}	Lavington ^{(3)}	Lavington ^{(3)}	Wod. Raiders ^{(1)}	Yarrawonga ^{(3)}	Wod. Raiders ^{(1)}	Wodonga ^{(1)}
2024	Wangaratta Rovers ^{(16)}	Wangaratta ^{()}	Wangaratta Rovers ^{()}	Football Club ^{()}	Football Club ^{()}	Football Club ^{()}	Football Club ^{()}	Football Club ^{()}
2025	Wangaratta Rovers ^{(17)}	Lavington ^{()}	Lavington ^{()}	Wodonga Raiders ^{(1)}	Yarrawonga ^{()}	Wangaratta Rovers ^{()}	Wangaratta Rovers ^{()}	Wodonga Raiders ^{()}
Season	Seniors^{(football 1893–)}	Reserves^{(football 1953–)}	Thirds^{(football 1973–)}	A Grade^{(netball 1993–)}	B Grade^{(netball 1993–)}	C Grade^{(netball 1996–)}	D Grade^{(netball 2012–)}	E Grade^{(netball 2023–)}

Notes

^{(a)}: Wangaratta were stripped of their 2022 senior premiership due to salary cap breaches under the AFL Victoria Player Points System and Allowable Player Payments Rules. The premiership was withheld by the OMNFL rather than awarding it to the runners up, Yarrawonga, following the precedent set by the National Rugby League after the Melbourne Storm salary cap breach.
^{(1)}: This number represents the number of premierships won.

Premiers: Football tally

**Football**		**Seniors (1893–)**		**Seconds (1953–)**		**Thirds / Under 18's (1973–)**	
Club	Total flags	Flags	Premiership years	Flags	Premiership years	Flags	Premiership years
**Albury**	35	22	1902, 1908, 1913, 1928, 1937, 1939, 1940, 1947, 1956, 1966, 1982, 1985, 1995, 1996, 1997, 2009, 2010, 2011, 2014, 2015, 2016, 2018.	07	1965, 1996, 2008, 2009, 2010, 2013, 2014.	03	1973, 2013, 2017.
Balldale	00	00	—	^{(N/A)}	—	^{(N/A)}	—
Barnawartha	00	00	—	^{(N/A)}	—	^{(N/A)}	—
Beechworth	03	03	1893, 1984, 1897.	^{(N/A)}	—	^{(N/A)}	—
Benalla	09	04	1953, 1962, 1963, 1973.	03	1955, 1972, 1978.	02	1974, 1997.
Benalla Rovers	00	00	—	^{(N/A)}	—	^{(N/A)}	—
Border United (Corowa-Wahgunyah)	00	00	—	^{(N/A)}	—	^{(N/A)}	—
Border United (East Albury-Weir United)	01	01	1934	^{(N/A)}	—	^{(N/A)}	—
Chiltern	00	00	—	^{(N/A)}	—	^{(N/A)}	—
Corowa	03	02	1932, 1968.	01	1953.	00	—
**Corowa-Rutherglen**	07	02	2000, 2003.	02	1986, 1992.	03	1983, 1984, 2000.
East Albury	00	00	—	^{(N/A)}	—	^{(N/A)}	—
Eldorado	00	00	—	^{(N/A)}	—	^{(N/A)}	—
Excelsior	01	01	1900	^{(N/A)}	—	^{(N/A)}	—
Great Southern	00	00	—	^{(N/A)}	—	^{(N/A)}	—
Howlong	01	01	1911.	^{(N/A)}	—	^{(N/A)}	—
Hume Weir	00	00	—	^{(N/A)}	—	^{(N/A)}	—
Lake Moodemere	00	00	—	^{(N/A)}	—	^{(N/A)}	—
Lake Rovers	03	03	1905, 1906, 1919.	^{(N/A)}	—	^{(N/A)}	—
**Lavington**	09	05	1983, 1986, 2001, 2005, 2019.	02	1982, 2015.	02	1993, 2009.
Lilliput	00	00	—	^{(N/A)}	—	^{(N/A)}	—
**Myrtleford**	05	01	1970.	02	1963, 1966.	02	1990, 2019.
**North Albury**	08	06	1948, 1955, 1980, 1984, 1999, 2002.	02	1954, 2000.	00	—
Rutherglen	15	15	1895, 1896, 1898, 1899, 1901, 1903, 1904, 1907, 1909, 1910, 1912, 1914, 1915, 1935, 1954.	00	—	00	—
South Albury	00	00	—	^{(N/A)}	—	^{(N/A)}	—
Springhurst	00	00	—	^{(N/A)}	—	^{(N/A)}	—
St. Patrick's	06	06	1921, 1922, 1923, 1924, 1926, 1927	^{(N/A)}	—	^{(N/A)}	—
United Miners	00	00	—	^{(N/A)}	—	^{(N/A)}	—
Wahgunyah	00	00	—	^{(N/A)}	—	^{(N/A)}	—
**Wangaratta**	28	15	1925, 1933, 1936, 1938, 1946, 1949, 1950, 1951, 1952, 1957, 1961, 1976, 2007, 2008, 2017.	05	1956, 1962, 1967, 1968, 1985.	08	1975, 1976, 1992, 2011, 2012, 2014, 2015, 2022.
**Wangaratta Rovers**	34	17	1958, 1960, 1964, 1965, 1971, 1972, 1974, 1975, 1977, 1978, 1979, 1988, 1991, 1993, 1994, 2024, 2025.	08	1958, 1962, 1976, 1977, 1980, 1983, 1984, 2007.	11	1980, 1985, 1988, 1995, 1996, 1998, 1999, 2002, 2003, 2008, 2018.
Weir United	02	02	1930, 1931.	^{(N/A)}	—	^{(N/A)}	—
West Albury	01	01	1929	^{(N/A)}	—	^{(N/A)}	—
West End	00	00	—	^{(N/A)}	—	^{(N/A)}	—
**Wodonga**	38	07	1967, 1969, 1981, 1987, 1990, 1992, 2004.	19	1956, 1957, 1960, 1961, 1969, 1970, 1971, 1979, 1981, 1987, 1989, 1990, 1993, 1994, 1995, 2001, 2004, 2005, 2006.	12	1977, 1978, 1979, 1981, 1982, 1986, 1987, 1991, 2001, 2005, 2006, 2007.
**Wodonga Raiders**	11	01	1998.	07	1991, 1997, 1998, 1999, 2002, 2003, 2017.	03	1989, 1994, 2010.
**Yarrawonga**	18	06	1959, 1989, 2006, 2012, 2013, 2023.	11	1964, 1973, 1974, 1975, 1988, 2011, 2012, 2016, 2018, 2019, 2022.	01	2016.

Notes

^{(N/A)}: This club was not in the league when these other competitions were introduced.

Club is currently affiliated to this league, but is in a state of recess
Club has since joined another league & is currently active
Club has since folded or merged & is no longer active as a solo club

Premiers: Netball tally

**Netball**		**A-Grade (1993–)**		**B-Grade (1993–)**		**C-Grade (1996–)**		**D-Grade / Under 17's (2012–)**		**E-Grade / Under 15's (2023–)**	
Club	Total flags	Flags	Premiership years	Flags	Premiership years	Flags	Premiership years	Flags	Premiership years	Flags	Premiership years
**Albury**	07	00	—	03	2000, 2010, 2011.	04	1998, 2000, 2003, 2013.	00	—	00	—
Benalla	00	00	—	00	—	00	—	^{(N/A)}	—	^{(N/A)}	—
**Corowa-Rutherglen**	03	00	—	03	1993, 2005, 2019.	00	—	00	—	00	—
**Lavington**	09	02	1998, 2013.	01	2022.	05	1997, 2014, 2015, 2017, 2022.	01	2013.	00	—
**Myrtleford**	06	04	1995, 1997, 2000, 2003.	02	2002, 2008.	00	—	00	—	00	—
**North Albury**	28	04	1996, 1999, 2007, 2008.	09	1994, 1996, 1998, 2006, 2012, 2013, 2014, 2015, 2017.	11	2001, 2002, 2004, 2005, 2006, 2007, 2008, 2010, 2011, 2016, 2018.	04	2012, 2014, 2015, 2018.	00	—
**Wangaratta**	06	02	2018, 2019.	01	2018.	02	2009, 2012.	01	2016.	00	—
**Wangaratta Rovers**	07	04	1993, 1994, 2005, 2006.	01	1999.	01	1996.	01	2019.	00	—
**Wodonga**	06	03	2002, 2004, 2015.	02	2005, 2007.	00	—	01	2022.	00	—
**Wodonga Raiders**	00	00	—	00	—	00	—	00	—	00	—
**Yarrawonga**	18	09	2001, 2009, 2010, 2011, 2012, 2014, 2016, 2017, 2022.	06	1997, 2001, 2003, 2004, 2009, 2016.	02	1999, 2019.	01	2017.	00	—

Notes

^{(N/A)}: This club was not in the league when these other competitions were introduced.

Club is currently affiliated to this league, but is in a state of recess
Club has since joined another league & is currently active
Club has since folded or merged & is no longer active as a solo club

- **Records: by competition level**
  - **Most premierships**
    - Seniors
      - (22) Albury
    - Reserves
      - (19) Wodonga
    - Thirds
      - (12) Wodonga & Wangaratta Rovers
    - A Grade
      - (9) Yarrawonga
    - B Grade
      - (9) North Albury
    - C Grade
      - (11) North Albury
    - D Grade
      - (4) North Albury
  - **Most premierships in a row**
    - Seniors
      - (4) St. Patrick (1921, 1922, 1923, 1924)
      - (4) Wangaratta (1949, 1950, 1951, 1952)
    - Reserves
      - (3) Wodonga (1969, 1970, 1971)
      - (3) Yarrawonga (1973, 1974, 1975)
      - (3) Wodonga (1993, 1994, 1995)
      - (3) Wodonga Raiders (1997, 1998, 1999)
      - (3) Wodonga (2004, 2005, 2006)
      - (3) Albury (2008, 2009, 2010)
    - Thirds
      - (4) Wodonga (2004, 2005, 2006, 2007)
    - A Grade
      - (4) Yarrawonga (2009, 2010, 2011, 2012)
    - B Grade
      - (4) North Albury (2012, 2013, 2014, 2015)
    - C Grade
      - (5) North Albury (2004, 2005, 2006, 2007, 2008)
    - D Grade
      - (2) North Albury (2014, 2015)

=== Records ===
==== Football: Seniors ====
- Most flags in a row:
  - 4, St. Patrick (1921, 1922, 1923, 1924).
  - 4, Wangaratta (1949, 1950, 1951, 1952).
- Most grand finals in a row:
  - 10: Albury: **2009**, **2010**, **2011**, 2012, 2013, **2014**, **2015**, **2016**, 2017, **2018**.
  - 7: Wangaratta Rovers: 1970, **1971, 1972,** (1973 – 3rd), **1974**, **1975**, 1976, **1977**, **1978**, **1979**, 1980.(10 grand finals in 11 years)
  - 5: Wangaratta: 1922, 1923, 1924, **1925**, 1926.

(bold: premiership years)

- **Most consecutive games won in a row**
  - 38 - Wangaratta Rovers. From Rd.8, 22nd May 1993 to Rd.1, 1st April, 1995.
- **Youngest O&MFNL senior football players**
  - 14 years, 6 months: Gerard Knobel - Myrtleford
  - 14 years, ? months: Kevin Witherden - Corowa in 1955.
  - 15 years, 6 months: Sam Lupo - Myrtleford in Rd.14, 2026.
  - 15 years, 7 months: Will Chandler - Corowa/Rutherglen in Rd.12, 2017.
  - 15 years, 10 months: Barry Connolly - Benalla in Rd.9, 1954.
- **Most goals kicked on debut**
  - 9 - Damien Houlihan: Rd.1, 1991 v Lavington
- **Most goals in an Elimination Final**
  - ?
- **Most goals in a Grand Final**
  - 10 - Damien Houlihan: 2000

=== Senior Football Premierships (1893–present) ===
Prior to World War One, there appears to have been no club coach appointments in the O&MFA, only a club captain. The H.J. "Did" Simpson Medal is given for the best on ground player in the O&MFL grand final. It was first awarded in 1991, and is presented at the post-match ceremony. The list of Did Simpson medallists is as follows:

Year	Premier	Score	Runners-up	Score	Best on ground	Captain / coach	Venue	Comments
1893	Beechworth	30	Rutherglen	28		James Shennan (Cpt)		
1894	Beechworth	38	Rutherglen	32		James Shennan		
1895	1st: Rutherglen	42	2nd: Beechworth	38		Tom Prentice (Cpt)		
1896	Rutherglen	40	Beechworth	38		Tom Prentice (Cpt)		
1897	Beechworth	3.4–22	Rutherglen	1.7–13		A Trim (Cpt)	Albury Sports Ground	Gate: £42 (a play off)
1898	1st: Rutherglen	40	2nd:Excelsior & 2nd: Beechworth	36		H Devers (Cpt)		
1899	1st: Rutherglen	44	2nd: Albury	32		Tom Prentice (Cpt)		
1900	Excelsior	2.11 – 23	Border United	2.1 – 13		G Evans (Cpt)	Barkly Park, Rutherglen	(a play off)
1901	Rutherglen	44	Albury	36		Tom Prentice (Cpt)		
1902	1st: Albury	40	2nd: Border United & 2nd: Rutherglen	32		Matt Hanlon (Cpt)		
1903	Rutherglen	28	Corowa	24		Bernie King (Cpt)		
1904	Rutherglen	32	Corowa	24		Bernie King (Cpt)		
1905	Lake Moodemere	20	Excelsior	12		Bert Cooper (Cpt)		
1906	Lake Moodemere	20	Chiltern	14		Bert Cooper (Cpt)		
1907	Rutherglen	7.14–56	Albury	4.4–28		Bernie King (Cpt)	Albury Sports Ground	£42 (a play off)
1908	Albury	10.4–64	Rutherglen	9.8–62		B Adamson (Cpt)	Albury Sports Ground	£46 (a play off)
1909	Rutherglen	10.10–70	Albury	5.7–37		Bernie King (Cpt)	Albury Sports Ground	£42 (a play off)
1910	1st: Rutherglen	24	2nd: Albury & 2nd: Excelsior	12		Bernie King (Cpt)		
1911	Howlong	7.11–53	Barnawatha	1.1–7		Harold Spears (Cpt)	Barkly Park, Rutherglen	£53
1912	Rutherglen	7.4–46	Albury	6.4–40		Bernie King (Cpt)	Barkly Park, Rutherglen	£58
1913	Albury	7.6–48	Rutherglen	5.10–40		Charles Waterstreet (Cpt)	Albury Sports Ground	£37
1914	Rutherglen	9.11–65	Border United	6.16–52		Arthur J Francis (Cpt)	Albury Sports Ground	
1915	Rutherglen	8.5–53	Lake Rovers	2.6–18		Arthur J Francis (Cpt)	Barkly Park, Rutherglen	£20
1916–18								Recess during WWI
1919	Lake Rovers	6.7–43	Howlong	4.4–28		W Plum (Cpt)	Corowa Recreation Reserve	
1920								League in recess
1921	St Patricks	7.19–61	Corowa	2.3–15		Jack McKenzie	Albury Show Grounds	£130
1922	St Patricks	6.9–45	Wangaratta	5.13–43		Jack McKenzie	Albury Show Grounds	£187.
1923	St Patricks	10.13–73	Wangaratta	8.8–56		W McInerney (Cpt)	Corowa Recreation Reserve	£252. Undefeated Premiers
1924	St Patricks	12	Wangaratta	8		Bert Sutton	Not applicable	No grand final
1925	Wangaratta	10.11–71	Hume Weir	7.8–50		Percy Rowe	Albury Sports Ground	£200 (undefeated Premiers)
1926	St Patricks	18.20–128	Wangaratta	6.9–35		Charlie Farrell	Corowa Recreation Reserve	£338
1927	St Patricks	12.29–101	Albury	7.11–53		George Shorten	Albury Sports Ground	£352
1928	Albury	12.8–80	St Patricks	8.16–60		Harry Hunter	Albury Sports Ground	£276
1929	West Albury	17.16–118	East Albury	15.14–104		Clarrie Nolan	Albury Sports Ground	
1930	Weir United	11.17–83	West Albury	7.9–51		Alan Bouch (Cpt)	Albury Sports Ground	£168
1931	Weir United	9.14–68	West Albury	4.7–31		J Reece	Albury Sports Ground	
1932	Corowa	11.14–80	West Albury	10.16–76		Ray "Nana" Baker	Albury Show Grounds	£130
1933	Wangaratta	11.5–71	Border United	10.10–70		Fred Carey	Corowa Recreation Reserve	£142
1934	Border United	11.22–88	Corowa	9.9–63		W McInerney	Albury Sports Ground	£70
1935	Rutherglen	13.10–88	Border United	10.22–82		Jack Hiskins	Corowa Recreation Reserve	£197
1936	Wangaratta	11.18–84	Rutherglen	9.10–64		Bert Carey	Corowa Recreation Reserve	£230
1937	Albury	16.13–109	Yarrawonga	9.9–63		Stan Judkins	Barkly Park, Rutherglen	
1938	Wangaratta	12.15–87	Yarrawonga	7.16–58		Norm Le Brun	Barkly Park, Rutherglen	£262
1939	Albury	12.12–84	Wodonga	11.15–81		Doug Strang	Barkly Park, Rutherglen	
1940	Albury	13.14–92	Yarrawonga	10.16–76		Doug Strang	Barkly Park, Rutherglen	£87
1941–45								In recess > WW2
1946	Wangaratta	14.10–94	Albury	13.11–89		Laurie Nash	Barkly Park, Rutherglen	£364
1947	Albury	11.18–84	Benalla	10.9–69		Tommy Lahiff	Wangaratta Showgrounds	£600
1948	North Albury	9.16–70	Albury	8.16–64		Keith Shea	Albury Sports Ground	£560
1949	Wangaratta	11.16–82	Wodonga	6.14–50		Mac Holten	Albury Sports Ground	£756
1950	Wangaratta	11.20–86	North Albury	10.10–70		Mac Holten	Barkly Park, Rutherglen	£868
1951	Wangaratta	16.7–103	Wodonga	12.7–79		Mac Holten	Albury Sports Ground	£1378
1952	Wangaratta	13.11–89	Rutherglen	10.9–69		Mac Holten	Albury Sports Ground	£1689
1953	Benalla	8.10–58	Albury	6.15–51		Norm Minns	Barkly Park, Rutherglen	£1227
1954	Rutherglen	15.17–107	Benalla	10.10–70		Greg Tate	Albury Sports Ground	£1813: Crowd: 13,000
1955	North Albury	13.15–93	Wangaratta	13.5–83		Tim Robb	Wangaratta Cricket Ground	£1925
1956	Albury	15.15–105	North Albury	11.6–72		Jack Jones	Albury Sports Ground	£1562
1957	Wangaratta	10.15–75	Albury	10.13–73		Jack McDonald		£2100 Crowd: 13,000
1958	Wangaratta Rovers	15.9–99	Wodonga	7.8–50		Bob Rose	Albury Sports Ground	£3000
1959	Yarrawonga	17.10–112	Wangaratta Rovers	16.8–104		Bill Stephen		£2710. Umpire: Harry Beitzel
1960	Wangaratta Rovers	11.17–83	Wodonga	8.13–61		Bob Rose	Albury Sports Ground	£3221
1961	Wangaratta	17.15–117	Benalla	7.12–54		Neville Waller	Martin Park, Wodonga	£2900 Crowd: 15,000
1962	Benalla	7.14–56	Wangaratta Rovers	6.10–46		Vin Williams		£6092
1963	Benalla	17.13–115	Corowa	8.3–51		Vin Williams	Wangaratta Cricket Ground	£6082
1964	Wangaratta Rovers	12.12–84	Wangaratta	9.7–61		Ken Boyd		£4660
1965	Wangaratta Rovers	14.9–93	Wangaratta	13.12–90		Ken Boyd		£3716
1966	Albury	14.11–95	Wangaratta	5.10–40		Murray Weideman		$4727
1967	Wodonga	11.17–83	Wangaratta Rovers	9.11–65		Mick Bone		$5886
1968	Corowa	14.11–95	Wodonga	12.16–88		Fred Swift	City Oval, Wangaratta	$5,216
1969	Wodonga	14.19–103	Wangaratta	9.15–69		Mick Bone		
1970	Myrtleford	18.15–123	Wangaratta Rovers	16.10–106		Martin Cross	Wang Showgrounds	
1971	Wangaratta Rovers	16.11–107	Yarrawonga	13.10–88		Neville Hogan		
1972	Wangaratta Rovers	12.20–92	Yarrawonga	11.9–75		Neville Hogan		
1973	Benalla	12.12–85	North Albury	11.11–77		Ken Roberts	Wang Showgrounds	
1974	Wangaratta Rovers	23.10–148	Yarrawonga	13.9–87		Neville Hogan	Martin Park, Wodonga	
1975	Wangaratta Rovers	8.12–60	North Albury	5.11–41		Neville Hogan	Albury Sports Ground	
1976	Wangaratta	17.11–113	Wangaratta Rovers	11.10–76		Phillip Nolan	City Oval, Wangaratta	
1977	Wangaratta Rovers	20.16–136	Wangaratta	12.12–84		Daryl Smith	Albury Sports Ground	
1978	Wangaratta Rovers	15.18–108	Benalla	7.12–54		Daryl Smith	Wang Showgrounds	
1979	Wangaratta Rovers	19.12–126	Wodonga	14.12–96		Daryl Smith	Bunton Park, Nth Albury	$12,684
1980	North Albury	17.11–113	Wangaratta Rovers	14.9–93		Col Trevaskis	Martin Park, Wodonga	$17,500
1981	Wodonga	19.11–125	Albury	14.14–98		David McLeish	Lavington	$22,000
1982	Albury	21.15–141	Lavington	16.11–107		Tom Doolan		$32,000
1983	Lavington	18.18–126	Albury	12.16–88		Ken W. Roberts		$34,500
1984	North Albury	14.16–100	Wodonga	14.13–97		Martin Cross		$36,102
1985	Albury	16.8–104	Lavington	15.11–101		Russell Campbell		$27,340
1986	Lavington	19.5–119	North Albury	10.10–70		Jeff Cassidy		$36,620
1987	Wodonga	29.22–196	Lavington	13.11–89		Jeff Gieschen		$39,000
1988	Wangaratta Rovers	14.17–101	Lavington	11.9–75		Laurie Burt	Albury Sports Ground	$25,550
1989	Yarrawonga	17.11–113	Wodonga	14.13–97		Neil Davis		$41,982
1990	Wodonga	10.22–82	Lavington	8.14–62	**Did Simpson Medallist**	Jeff Gieschen	Albury Sports Ground	$29,550
1991	Wangaratta Rovers	17.16–118	Yarrawonga	7.7–49	Mick Caruso (WR)	Laurie Burt	Wang Showgrounds	$33,990
1992	Wodonga	16.16–112	Corowa-Rutherglen	14.6–90	Mick Atkins (W)	Ernie Whitehead	Lavington	$35,633
1993	Wangaratta Rovers	18.13–121	Wodonga	12.9–81	Mick Caruso (WR)	Laurie Burt	Lavington	$25,351
1994	Wangaratta Rovers	14.14–98	Wodonga	5.9–39	Rob Walker (WR)	Laurie Burt	Lavington	$25,584. Undefeated Premiers
1995	Albury	5.13–43	Wodonga	6.3–39	Ken Howe (A)	Paul Spargo	Lavington	$28,025
1996	Albury	13.16–94	Lavington	10.11–71	Stephen Ash (A)	Paul Spargo	Lavington	$46,092
1997	Albury	13.8–86	Wodonga Raiders	11.13–79	Tim Scott (A)	Michael Buchanan	Lavington	$50,314
1998	Wodonga Raiders	19.12–126	Lavington	8.14–62	Geoff Valentine (WR)	Darren Harris	Lavington	$40,387
1999	North Albury	17.12–114	Albury	14.3–87	Corey Lambert (NA)	Ernie Whitehead	Lavington	$48,587
2000	Corowa-Rutherglen	27.18–180	North Albury	11.6–72	Damian Houlihan (C/R)	Peter Tossol	Lavington	$46,527
2001	Lavington	21.21–147	Myrtleford	13.9–87	John Hunt (L)	Tim Sanson	Lavington	
2002	North Albury	21.11–137	Wangaratta Rovers	13.11–89	Simon McCormick (NA)	Corey Lambert	Lavington	
2003	Corowa-Rutherglen	16.14–110	Wodonga	10.15–75	Ricky Symes (C/R)	Peter Tossol	Lavington	
2004	Wodonga	16.17–113	North Albury	11.6–72	Matthew Shir (W)	Richard Bence	Lavington	
2005	Lavington	10.12–72	Myrtleford	11.5–71	Corey Brown (L)	Tim Sanson	Lavington	
2006	Yarrawonga	15.11–101	Myrtleford	10.8–68	Jason Wild (Y)	Bob Craig	Lavington	
2007	Wangaratta	15.10–100	North Albury	6.13–49	Ed Clarke (W)	Jason Lappin	Lavington	
2008	Wangaratta	12.14–86	Lavington	7.12–54	Sam Higgs (W)	Jason Lappin	Lavington	
2009	Albury	22.13–145	Yarrawonga	9.14–68	Chris Hyde (A)	Paul Spargo	Lavington	
2010	Albury	13.11–89	Yarrawonga	11.13–79	Daniel Maher (A)	Paul Spargo	Lavington	
2011	Albury	15.13–103	Yarrawonga	14.10–94	Charles Gaylard (A)	Paul Spargo	Lavington	
2012	Yarrawonga	14.9–93	Albury	12.9–81	Craig Ednie (Y)	Drew Barnes & Chris Kennedy	Lavington	
2013	Yarrawonga	13.12–90	Albury	8.6–54	Drew Barnes (Y)	Drew Barnes & Chris Kennedy	Lavington	
2014	Albury	13.13–91	Yarrawonga	12.12–84	Connor Hargreaves (Y)	Chris Hyde & Daniel Maher	Lavington	
2015	Albury	17.11.113	Lavington	11.18.84	Joel Mackie (A)	Chris Hyde & Daniel Maher	Lavington	
2016	Albury	9.17.71	Lavington	4.7.31	Daniel Cross (A)	Shaun Daly & Daniel Maher	Lavington	
2017	Wangaratta	16.9.105	Albury	13.6.84	Michael Newton (W)	Dean Stone	Lavington	
2018	Albury	11.12.78	Wangaratta	10.10.70	Dean Polo (A)	Chris Hyde & Shaun Daly	Norm Minns Oval	
2019	Lavington	14.14.98	Wangaratta	9.10.64	Shaun Mannagh (L)	Simon Curtis	Norm Minns Oval	
2020								In recess > COVID-19
2021	1st:Albury	13 wins 0 losses	2nd: Wangaratta	11 wins 2 losses		Anthony Miles & Luke Daly		13 rounds played No finals > COVID-19
2022	Wangaratta*	12.14.86	Yarrawonga	13.5.83	Callum Moore (W)	Ben Reid	Lavington	*Premiership withdrawn
2023	Yarrawonga	11.10.76	Albury	10.12.72	Michael Gibbons (Y)	Steve Johnson	Lavington	
2024	Wangaratta Rovers	11.6.72	Yarrawonga	9.15.69	Ed Dayman (WR)	Sam Murray	Lavington	
2025	Wangaratta Rovers	9.7 (61)	Wangaratta	6.10 (46)	Will Christie (WR)	Sam Murray	Lavington	$78,751
2026	Wangaratta Rovers	15.14 (104)	Wangaratta	9.15 (69)	Ed Dayman (WR)	Sam Murray	Lavington	$76,258
2027							Lavington	
Year	Premier	Score	Runners-up	Score	Best on ground Did Simpson Medal	Premiership coach	Venue	Comments

For Grand Final records in all grades click here

=== Reserves Football Premierships (1953–present) ===
The O&MFL Reserves competition commenced in 1953 and the best on ground award in the O&MFNL Reserves grand final is called the Carl Norton Medal in honour of former Wangaratta footballer, Carl Norton, which was perhaps first awarded in 2022.

Year	Premier	Score	Runners-up	Score	Coach	Best on ground
1953	Corowa	3.13 – 31	Albury	2.10 – 22	Jack Bartlett	
1954	North Albury	8.10 – 58	Albury	7.16 – 58		(Drawn G Final)
	North Albury	10.7 – 67	Albury	7.10 – 52	Len Egan	(G Final Replay)
1955	Benalla	12.6 – 78	North Albury	10.7 – 67		
1956	Wodonga	5.14 – 44	Albury	0.5 – 5	Ken Adamson	
1957	Wodonga	13.24 – 102	Wangaratta Rovers	9.13 – 67	Ken Adamson	
1958	Wangaratta Rovers	4.3 – 27	Albury	3.7 – 25	Bob Rose	Premiers & Champions
1959	Wangaratta	13.12 – 90	Benalla	7.7 – 49	Neville Waller	
1960	Wodonga	12.17 – 89	Wangaratta Rovers	8.7 – 55	Des Healey	
1961	Wodonga	10.21 – 81	Wangaratta Rovers	6.14 – 50	Lionel Ryan	
1962	Wangaratta Rovers	17.15 – 127	Benalla	7.7 – 49	Bob Rose	
1963	Myrtleford	11.5 – 71	Wangaratta Rovers	7.5 – 47	Ron Branton	
1964	Yarrawonga	17.18 – 120	Wangaratta	11.4 – 70		
1965	Albury	8.12 – 60	Wangaratta	8.1 – 49		
1966	Myrtleford	12.11 – 83	Wangaratta	10.16 – 76	Martin Cross	
1967	Wangaratta	13.10 – 88	Wodonga	11.10 – 76	Trevor Steer	
1968	Wangaratta	14.10 – 94	Wodonga	7.7 – 49	Trevor Steer	
1969	Wodonga	10.18 – 78	Wangaratta Rovers	11.8 – 74	Tony Conway	
1970	Wodonga	12.12 – 84	Yarrawonga	10.9 – 69	Tony Conway	
1971	Wodonga	13.10 – 88	Benalla	10.11 – 71	Tony Conway	
1972	Benalla	12.13 – 85	Yarrawonga	10.17 – 77		
1973	Yarrawonga	13.15 – 92	Corowa	12.18 – 90	Frank Seymour	
1974	Yarrawonga	19.14 – 128	Benalla	9.7 – 61	Frank Seymour	
1975	Yarrawonga	11.12 – 78	Wangaratta Rovers	7.6 – 48	Frank Seymour	
1976	Wangaratta Rovers	15.15 – 105	Wodonga	7.7 – 49	Geoff Welch	
1977	Wangaratta Rovers	17.15 – 117	Myrtleford	10.12 – 72	Geoff Welch	
1978	Benalla	23.11 – 149	Wangaratta	11.16 – 82		
1979	Wodonga	15.5 – 95	Wangaratta Rovers	14.8 – 92	Russell Fitzpatrick	
1980	Wangaratta Rovers	26.18 – 174	Wodonga	9.9 – 63	Geoff Welch	
1981	Wodonga	15.18 – 108	North Albury	12.11 – 83	Ron Hill	
1982	Lavington	22.15 – 150	Benalla	15.14 – 104	Barry Pascoe	
1983	Wangaratta Rovers	12.18 – 90	Albury	5.9 – 39	Geoff Welch	
1984	Wangaratta Rovers	18.20 – 128	Wangaratta	11.15 – 81	Geoff Welch	
1985	Wangaratta	22.10 – 142	North Albury	17.13 – 115	Shane Douthie	
1986	Corowa-Rutherglen	19.15 – 129	Wodonga	17.6 – 108	G Dwyer	
1987	Wodonga	19.18 – 132	North Albury	14.15 – 99	Bob Craig	
1988	Yarrawonga	13.19 – 97	Wodonga	13.11 – 89	Paul Walker	
1989	Wodonga	17.19 – 121	Lavington	12.10 – 82	Richard Bence	
1990	Wodonga	17.17 – 119	Lavington	14.7 – 91	Richard Bence	
1991	Wodonga Raiders	17.16 – 118	Corowa-Rutherglen?	7.7 – 49	Glen Wilkinson	
1992	Corowa-Rutherglen	10.14 – 74	Wodonga	10.12 – 62	G Hansen	
1993	Wodonga	16.18 – 114	Wangaratta	10.16 – 76	Terry Burgess	
1994	Wodonga	15.8 – 98	Albury	7.5 – 47	Terry Burgess	
1995	Wodonga	6.13 – 49	Wodonga Raiders	6.8 – 44	Terry Burgess	
1996	Albury	14.11 – 95	Wodonga Raiders	9.10 – 64	Tom McGrath	
1997	Wodonga Raiders	21.11 – 137	Albury	12.10 – 82	Darren Fraser	
1998	Wodonga Raiders	15.8 – 98	Albury	12.19 – 91	Dale Smith	
1999	Wodonga Raiders	12.18 – 90	Albury	12.12 – 84	Dale Smith	
2000	North Albury	9.12 – 66	Wodonga Raiders	5.13 – 43	Owen Geddes	
2001	Wodonga	21.6 – 132	Albury	10.12 – 72	Tony Way	
2002	Wodonga Raiders	11.11 – 77	Wodonga	11.9 – 75	Paul Twycross	
2003	Wodonga Raiders	16.6 – 102	North Albury	13.6 – 84	Ian Butler	
2004	Wodonga	21.11 – 137	Wodonga Raiders	11.16 – 82	Chris Martin	
2005	Wodonga	14.9 – 93	Wangaratta Rovers	5.3 – 33	Chris Martin	
2006	Wodonga	13.5 – 83	Wangaratta Rovers	9.10 – 64	Damian Slater	
2007	Wangaratta Rovers	16.11 – 107	Albury	6.3 – 39	Bob Murray	
2008	Albury	12.17 – 89	Lavington	12.15 – 87	Jeremy Masterson	Mitchell Palmer (L)
2009	Albury	17.16 – 118	Wodonga	10.8 – 68	Jeremy Masterson	
2010	Albury	15.16 – 106	Yarrawonga	10.10 – 70	Jeremy Masterson	
2011	Yarrawonga	15.15 – 105	Albury	11.14 – 80	Matt Grinter	
2012	Yarrawonga	11.10 – 76	Lavington	9.7 – 61	Will Cooper	
2013	Albury	15.15 – 105	Lavington	8.8 – 56	Josh Hillary	
2014	Albury	28.18 – 186	Wangaratta	4.4 – 28	Tom McGrath	
2015	Lavington	20.14 – 134	Wodonga	7.11 – 53	Mark Chandler	
2016	Yarrawonga	5.4 – 34	Albury	1.6 – 12	Richard Handreck	
2017	Wodonga Raiders	10.11 – 71	Yarrawonga	8.3 – 51	Joe Lonergan	
2018	Yarrawonga	14.15 – 99	Wodonga Raiders	5.31	Tim Seal	
2019	Yarrawonga	11.11 – 77	Albury	3.5 – 23	Tim Seal	
2020						In recess>COVID-19
2021	1st: Albury	13 wins, 0 losses	2nd: Wangaratta	9 wins, 4 losses	Stuart Thompson	No finals>COVID-19
2022	Yarrawonga	10.8 – 68	Wangaratta Rovers	7.14 – 56	Matt Grinter	Jacob Atkins (Y)
2023	Albury	8.13 – 61	Lavington	4.6 – 30	Will Haberecht & Chris Lockhart	Rory Parnall (A)
2024	Wangaratta	11.7 – 73	Albury	7.8 – 50	Brennan Jenvey	Braeden Marjanovic (W)
2025	Lavington	8.13 – 61	Wangaratta Rovers	1.9 – 15	Wade McPherson & James Oeser	?
2026	Wangaratta Rovers	8.10 - 58	Albury	8.8 - 56	Daniel McLaughlin	Justin Lewis (WR)
2027						
Year	Premier	Score	Runners-up	Score	Coach	Best on ground Carl Norton Medal

=== Thirds Football Premierships (1973–present) ===
The O&MFL Thirds / Under 18's competition commenced in 1973 and the best on ground award in the O&MFNL Thirds grand final is called the Brett Kirk Medal in honour of former North Albury and Sydney Swans footballer, Brett Kirk, which was first awarded in ?

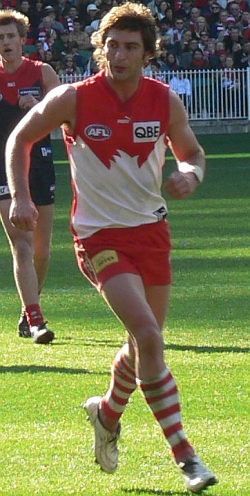
Brett Kirk, 2006

Year	Premier	Score	Runners-up	Score	Coach	Best on ground
1973	Albury	13.15 – 93	Benalla	9.8 – 62	A Boyle	
1974	Benalla	14.10 – 94	Wangaratta	8.4 – 52	Father Brian O'Connell	
1975	Wangaratta	13.16 – 94	Wodonga	8.12 – 60	Tom Norman	
1976	Wangaratta	16.11 – 107	Benalla	10.6 – 66	Ian Moscrop	
1977	Wodonga	12.11 – 83	Wangaratta Rovers	6.16 – 52	Mick Cummins	
1978	Wodonga	10.10 – 70	Wangaratta	8.10 – 56	Mick Cummins	
1979	Wodonga	14.20 – 104	Wangaratta	7.8 – 50	Mick Cummins	
1980	Wangaratta Rovers	12.7 – 79	Wodonga	9.16 – 70	John Welch	
1981	Wodonga	10.12 – 72	Benalla	9.14 – 68	Mick Cummins	
1982	Wodonga	16.19 – 115	Albury	6.14 – 50	Mick Cummins	
1983	Corowa-Rutherglen	14.11 – 95	Wodonga	11.13 – 79	Ken Eales	
1984	Corowa-Rutherglen	16.13 – 109	Wodonga	10.5 – 65	Ken Eales	
1985	Wangaratta Rovers	13.14 – 92	Wodonga	7.9 – 51	Daryl Smith	
1986	Wodonga	17.11 – 113	Wangaratta Rovers	11.16 – 82	Mick Cummins	
1987	Wodonga	20.14 – 134	Lavington	10.17 – 77	Mick Cummins	
1988	Wangaratta Rovers	19.3 – 117	Corowa-Rutherglen	5.7 – 37	Alan White	
1989	Wodonga Raiders	20.12 – 132	Wangaratta Rovers	7.10 – 52	I Waite	
1990	Myrtleford	10.15 – 75	Albury	9.14 – 68	Paul Langdon	
1991	Wodonga	13.13 – 91	Wodonga Raiders	4.7 – 31	David McLeish	
1992	Wangaratta	9.12 – 66	Wodonga	6.11 – 47	Maurie Braden	
1993	Lavington	12.12 – 84	North Albury	11.6 – 72	Wayne Styles	
1994	Wodonga Raiders	10.10 – 70	Wangaratta Rovers	3.8 – 32	Gary Corcoran	
1995	Wangaratta Rovers	9.8 – 62	Wodonga	8.6 – 54	Geoff Welch	
1996	Wangaratta Rovers	10.7 – 67	Benalla	9.9 – 63	Geoff Welch	
1997	Benalla	9.9 – 63	Wodonga Raiders	8.12 – 60	Geoff Hill	
1998	Wangaratta Rovers	10.13 – 73	Yarrawonga	5.4 – 34	Barry Clarke	
1999	Wangaratta Rovers	10.4 – 64	Lavington	7.13 – 55	Barry Clarke	
2000	Corowa-Rutherglen	6.12 – 48	Wangaratta	4.5 – 29	Mark Mills	
2001	Wodonga	6.3 – 39	Wangaratta Rovers	5.5 – 35	Steve Williamson	
2002	Wangaratta Rovers	10.16 – 76	Wodonga	5.3 – 33	John McNamara	
2003	Wangaratta Rovers	8.14 – 62	Wodonga	5.6 – 36	Paul Maher	
2004	Wodonga	20.15 – 135	Wangaratta Rovers	6.10 – 46	Steve Williamson	
2005	Wodonga	6.14 – 50	Wangaratta Rovers	4.10 – 34	Adam Mudra	
2006	Wodonga	8.14 – 62	Wangaratta	6.10 – 46	Adam Mudra	
2007	Wodonga	15.14 – 104	Wangaratta	4.1 – 25	Adam Mudra	
2008	Wangaratta Rovers	14.15 – 99	Yarrawonga	12.6 – 78	Rick Martin	Tim Segrave (WR)
2009	Lavington	17.20 – 122	Wodonga Raiders	13.6 – 84	Craig Mannagh	
2010	Wodonga Raiders	15.7 – 97	Alpine Eagles	7.19 – 61	Terry Burgess	
2011	Wangaratta	12.8 – 80	Wangaratta Rovers	11.6 – 72	Justin McMahon	
2012	Wangaratta	8.11 – 59	Albury	8.8 – 56	Carl Norton	
2013	Albury	11.11 – 77	Lavington	8.9 – 57	Neale Poole	
2014	Wangaratta	11.11 – 77	Lavington	8.9 – 57	Carl Norton	
2015	Wangaratta	10.9 – 69	Wodonga	8.12 – 60	Dean Stone	
2016	Yarrawonga	7.10 – 52	Wangaratta	2.7 – 19	Marcus Cummins	
2017	Albury	14.14 – 98	Wangaratta	8.11 – 59	Dale Carroll	
2018	Wangaratta Rovers	11.12 – 78	Yarrawonga	10.6 – 66	Jason Gorman	Ed Dayman (WR)
2019	Myrtleford	11.8 – 74	Wangaratta	9.12 – 66	Tristan Purss	?
2020						In recess > COVID-19
2021	1st: Albury	13 wins, 0 losses	2nd: Wangaratta	11 wins, 2 losses	Tom McGrath	No finals > COVID-19
2022	Wangaratta	10.13 – 73	Corowa-Rutherglen	10.9 – 69	Damien Lappin	Jedd Longmire (CR)
2023	Lavington	8.10 – 58	Wangaratta Rovers	9.2 – 56	Ken Mansell	Corby Robertson (L)
2024	Wangaratta Rovers	7.13 – 55	Wangaratta	5.11 – 41	Dan McCarthy & Mick Pellegrino	Ryley Ely (WR)
2025	Lavington	9.9 – 63	Wangaratta	6.7 – 43	Peter Dean	Isaiah Robertson (L)
2026	Wangaratta	7.11 - 53	Wodonga Raiders	4.13 - 37	Chris Knowles	Willy Prebble
Year	Premier	Score	Runners-up	Score	Coach	Best on Ground Brett Kirk Medal

=== Pre-Season Football Premiership ===
Senior Football

- 1975 - Wangaratta Rovers
- 1979 - Corowa/Rutherglen
- 1990 - Wangaratta Rovers
- 1993 - Wodonga
- 1994 - Wodonga

=== Current finals system ===
Since 1972 the OMFL has used the "McIntyre system". The final series is played over four weekends, with the grand final traditionally being played on the third weekend of September. Also normally there is no home ground advantage is awarded any teams, instead the O&M board deems where the finals will be held, with all finals for both Football & Netball are played at the one venue during each final day. The Grand Final since 1995 has been held at Lavington Sports Ground ("Lavington Panthers Oval") in the Albury suburb of Hamilton Valley.

**Qualifying final**
**"A"**	2nd on Ladder	Home
3	3rd on Ladder	Away
**"B"**	4th on Ladder	Home
5	5th on Ladder	Away

**Major Semi-final**
**"C"**	1st on Ladder	Home
Winner Qualifying Final	Away
**Minor Semi-final**
**"D"**	Loser Qualifying Final	Home
Winner Elimination Final	Away

Preliminary final
**"E"**	Loser Major Semi-Final	Home
Winner Minor Semi-Final	Away

**Grand Final**
**"F"**	Winner Major Semi-Final	Home
Winner Preliminary Final	Away

==== 2024 Finals Series ====
Qualifying and elimination finals
2	**Wangaratta Rovers**	**12.11 (83)**
3	Wangaratta	5.9 (39)
4	**North Albury**	**11.5 (71)**
5	Wodonga	10.8 (68)

**Major Semi-final**
1	**Yarrawonga**	**17.9 (111)**
Wangaratta Rovers	5.10 (40)
**Minor Semi-final**
Wangaratta	12.8 (80)
**North Albury**	**12.10 (82)**

Preliminary final
**Wangaratta Rovers**	**16.9 (105)**
North Albury	11.4 (70)

**Grand Final**
Yarrawonga	9.15 (69)
**Wangaratta Rovers**	**11.6 (72)**

== O&MFNL – Club Championships ==
=== Cleaver E. Bunton Football Championships ===
From 1953 to 1972 total points were based on the most ladder points across the seniors and reserves grades of O&MFL football. Unsure what year this award was first given.

From 1973 onwards, this award is based on the most ladder points across all three grades of O&MFL football.

- 1964: Wangaratta
- 1965: Albury
- 1966: Wangaratta
- 1967: Wangaratta
- 1968: Myrtleford
- 1969: Wodonga
- 1970: Wodonga
- 1971: Benalla
- 1972: Benalla
- 1973: ?
- 1974: Yarrawonga
- 1975: Wangaratta Rovers
- 1976: ?
- 1977: Wangaratta Rovers
- 1978: Wangaratta Rovers
- 1979: Wodonga
- 1980:
- 1981:
- 1982: Wodonga
- 1983: Albury
- 1984: Wangaratta Rovers
- 1985: Albury
- 1986: Wodonga
- 1987: Wodonga
- 1988: Wangaratta Rovers
- 1989: Wodonga
- 1990: Wodonga
- 1991: Wodonga
- 1992: Wodonga
- 1993: Wodonga
- 1994: Wodonga
- 1995: Albury
- 1996: Albury
- 1997: Wodonga Raiders
- 1998: Wodonga Raiders
- 1999: Albury
- 2000: Albury & Corowa Rutherglen
- 2001: Wangaratta Rovers
- 2002: Wangaratta Rovers
- 2003: Wodonga Raiders
- 2004: Wodonga
- 2005: Wodonga
- 2006: Wodonga & Wangaratta
- 2007: Wodonga
- 2008: Albury
- 2009: Albury
- 2010: Albury
- 2011: Albury
- 2012: Albury
- 2013: Albury
- 2014: Albury
- 2015: Albury
- 2016: Albury
- 2017: Albury
- 2018: Albury
- 2019: Albury
- 2020: O&M in recess. COVID-19
- 2021: Albury
- 2022: Wangaratta Rovers
- 2023: Albury
- 2024: Wangaratta Rovers
- 2025: Wangaratta Rovers

=== Anne Lawrence Netball Championships ===
- 1997: North Albury
- 1998: North Albury
- 1999: Yarrawonga
- 2000: Albury
- 2001: Albury
- 2002: Yarrawonga
- 2003: Yarrawonga
- 2004: Wodonga
- 2005: North Albury
- 2006: North Albury
- 2007: North Albury
- 2008: North Albury
- 2009: North Albury
- 2010: North Albury
- 2011: North Albury
- 2012: North Albury
- 2013: Lavington
- 2014: North Albury
- 2015: North Albury
- 2016: Lavington
- 2017: Lavington & North Albury
- 2018: North Albury
- 2019: Corowa Rutherglen
- 2020: O&M in recess. COVID-19
- 2021: Yarrawonga
- 2022: Corowa Rutherglen
- 2023: Wodonga Raiders
- 2024: Wodonga Raiders
- 2025: Wodonga Raiders

=== Overall Club Championship ===
- 2010: Yarrawonga
- 2011: Albury
- 2012: Lavington
- 2013: Albury & Lavington
- 2014: Albury
- 2015: Albury
- 2016: Lavington
- 2017: Albury
- 2018: Yarrawonga
- 2019: Wangaratta
- 2020: O&M in recess. COVID-19
- 2021: Albury
- 2022: Yarrawonga
- 2023: Wangaratta
- 2024: Wangaratta
- 2025: Wangaratta

== Awards ==
=== Football: Seniors Best and Fairest ===
The Morris Medal is given for the best and fairest senior player in the O&MFL during the home and away season at a vote count held in the week preceding the grand final. The award is similar to the AFL's Brownlow Medal, with match day umpires awarding 3, 2 and 1 votes to the best players in each match. The medal has been donated by C H Morris & Sons Wines of Rutherglen since 1933.

Seniors: Morris Medalists (1933–2025)

The list of Morris Medallists follows:

- 1933: Fred Carey (Wangaratta – 18)
- 1934: H S G "Jock" Ball (Yarrawonga – 22)
- 1935: Noel Barnett (Albury – 14)
- 1936: Alan McCauley (Rutherglen – 15)
- 1937: George Hayes (Yarrawonga – 13)
- 1938: Kelt Emery (Wodonga – 19)
- 1939: Bill Francis (Rutherglen – 17)
- 1940: Gordon Strang (Wodonga – 10)
- 1941: Recess – World War II
- 1942: Recess – World War II
- 1943: Recess – World War II
- 1944: Recess – World War II
- 1945: Recess – World War II
- 1946: Alan Dunn (Rutherglen – 19)
- 1947: Keith Williams (Border United – 18)
- 1948: Alec White (Yarrawonga – 25)
- 1949: Jack Eames (Wodonga – 22)
- 1950: Alan Dunn (Rutherglen – 25)
- 1951: Norm Hawking (Rutherglen – 24)
- 1952: Norm Webb (Wodonga – 22)
- 1953: Tim Lowe (Wangaratta – 21)
- 1954: Kevin Hurley (Benalla – 19)
- 1955: Ray Preston (Wangaratta – 22)
- 1956: Lance Mann (Albury – 28)
- 1957: Neil Currie (Myrtleford – 23)
  and Lance Oswald (Wangaratta – 23)
- 1958: Jim Deane (Myrtleford – 21)
  and Bob Rose (Wangaratta Rovers – 21)
- 1959: Jim Sandral (Corowa – 21)
- 1960: Bob Rose (Wangaratta Rovers – 23)
- 1961: Jim Deane (Myrtleford – 22)
- 1962: Jim Sandral (Corowa – 23)
- 1963: Ken Bennett (Albury – 17)
- 1964: David Sykes (North Albury – 22)
  and Jim Sandral (Corowa – 22)
- 1965: Joe Ambrose (Albury – 22)
  and Alby Dunn (Corowa – 22)
- 1966: Neville Hogan (Wangaratta Rovers – 19)
- 1967: Gary Williamson (Wodonga – 23)
- 1968: John Waddington (Benalla – 16)
- 1969: Jeff Hemphill (Wangaratta – 18)
- 1970: John Clancy (Corowa – 25)
- 1971: John Clancy (Corowa – 21)
- 1972: Bruce Waite (Myrtleford – 20)
- 1973: John Smith (North Albury – 25)
- 1974: Alan Way (Corowa – 15)
- 1975: Andrew Scott (Wangaratta Rovers – 18)
  and Jack O'Halloran (Wangaratta – 18)
- 1976: Jack O'Halloran (Wangaratta – 19)
  and Mike Andrews (Myrtleford – 19)
  and Greg O'Brien (Wangaratta Rovers – 19)
- 1977: Rod Page (Myrtleford – 20)
  and Ken Boundy (Rutherglen – 20)
- 1978: Mark Mills (Corowa – 24)
- 1979: Peter Howard (Myrtleford – 30)
- 1980: Peter Howard (Myrtleford – 21)
- 1981: Rod Coelli (Albury – 21)
- 1982: Peter Gorski (Albury – 22)
- 1983: Terry Burgess (Myrtleford – 24)
- 1984: Rudy Yonson (North Albury – 18)
- 1985: Ralph Aalbers (Lavington – 16)
- 1986: Les Parish (Yarrawonga – 22)
- 1987: Richard Hamilton (Lavington – 14)
- 1988: John Brunner (Yarrawonga – 19)
- 1989: Brett Allen (Wodonga – 21)
  and John Brunner (Yarrawonga – 21)
- 1990: Jamie Ronke (Benalla – 19)
- 1991: Robbie Walker (Wangaratta Rovers – 31)
- 1992: Steven Murphy (Wodonga – 23)
- 1993: Tim Scott (Albury – 22)
- 1994: Tim Scott (Albury – 22)
  and John Kingston (Corowa-Rutherglen – 22)
- 1995: Ken Howe (Albury – 24)
- 1996: Leigh Newton (Albury – 25)
- 1997: Robbie Walker (Wangaratta Rovers – 24)
- 1998: Mark Lambertini (Myrtleford – 18)
- 1999: Robbie Walker (Wangaratta Rovers – 25)
  and Corey Lambert (North Albury – 25)
- 2000: John Brunner (Yarrawonga – 27)
- 2001: Robbie Walker (Wangaratta Rovers – 21)
- 2002: Tim Hargreaves (Yarrawonga – 17)
  and Dustin Burns (Wodonga Raiders – 17)
- 2003: Robbie Walker (Wangaratta Rovers – 25)
- 2004: Ryan Mackenzie (Corowa-Rutherglen – 21)
- 2005: Brad Murray (Myrtleford – 21)
- 2006: Craig Ednie (Yarrawonga – 20)
- 2007: Jonathon McCormick (Wangaratta – 24)
- 2008: Jake Ryan (Corowa-Rutherglen – 31)
- 2009: Michael Stevens (Yarrawonga – 23)
- 2010: Jamie Allan (Wangaratta – 27)
- 2011: Shaun Daly (Albury – 23)
- 2012: Joel Mackie (Albury – 27)
- 2013: Xavier Leslie (Yarrawonga – 21)
- 2014: Kristan Height (Myrtleford – 26)
- 2015: Joel Mackie (Albury – 22)
- 2016: Tyler Bonat (Yarrawonga – 23)
  and Matt Seiter (Wodonga – 23)
- 2017: Chris Hyde (Albury – 18)
- 2018: Brodie Filo (Wodonga Raiders – 25)
- 2019: Jarrod Hodgkins (Wodonga Raiders – 24)
- 2020: No O&MFNL season > COVID-19
- 2021: Callum Moore (Wangaratta – 17)
- 2022: Leigh Masters (Yarrawonga – 19)
- 2023: Elliott Powell (Albury – 23)
- 2024: Willie Wheeler (Yarrawonga – 17)
- 2025: Shaun Driscoll(Lavington – 19)
  and Jackson East (Myrtleford – 19)
  and Lochie O'Brien (Wangaratta Rovers – 19)
- 2026: Jackson Clarke (Wangaratta – 20)
  and Cameron Wilson (Yarrawonga – 20)

Most Votes, but Ineligible

The only two players who have polled the most votes, but were ineligible to win the O&MFL Morris Medal, due to suspension, were:

- Gordon Strang of Wodonga in 1939 (polled 20 votes), and
- John Smith of North Albury in 1974 (polled 16 votes).

The player who has won the most Morris Medals is Robbie Walker, who won five while playing for the Wangaratta Rovers, followed by Jim Sandral (Corowa) and John Brunner (Yarrawonga) with three apiece.

In 2000 the O&MFNL awarded retrospective Morris Medals to senior competition footballers (but not to reserves and thirds grade players) who had polled the same number of votes as the winner, but finished second under the count-back system in years gone by and been denied the honour of a medal. The players who received these medals were Lance Oswald 1957, Bob Rose 1958, Jim Sandral 1964, Alby Dunn 1965, Jack O'Halloran 1975, Mike Andrews 1976, Greg O'Brien 1976 and Ken Boundy 1977.

=== Football: Reserves Best and Fairest ===
The Reserves Leo Burke Medal is awarded for the best and fairest seconds football player in the O&MFL during the home and away season. It was originally called the Ralph Marks Award from 1953 to 1963. Marks was a former president of North Albury, an O&MFL official, and the O&MFL secretary from 1970 to 1975. The award was then called the Les Cuddon Award from 1964 to 1975, after an O&MFL official from Rutherglen. Leo Burke from Burke's Hotel, Yarrawonga took over as the award donor in 1975.

Reserves:	Leo Burke Medal								
Year	Winner	Club	Votes	Second	Club	Votes	Third	Club	Votes
Ralph Marks Medal
1953	Max Pescud	Myrtleford	21	Neil Hoffman	North Albury	17	Harold Purss	Albury	15
1954	Ron Teakle*	Myrtleford	9	R Symes	Benalla	8	Barry Connolly	Benalla	7
	Ernie Aitken	Corowa	(9)				R Horsborough	Benalla	7
	Harold Purss	Albury	(9)						
1955	Jack Rippingdale	Corowa	23	Col Sturgeon	Wangaratta	18	Ken Adamson	Wodonga	17
1956	Ken Adamson	Wodonga							
1957	Norm Hawking	Rutherglen		Ron Teakle	Myrtleford		Ken Adamson	Wodonga	13
							Gayfer	Rutherglen	13
							P Maher	Benalla	13
1958	Brian McKoy	Wodonga	19	Ivan Smith	North Albury	18	Col Sturgeon	Wangaratta	17
1959	D McQuade	Rutherglen	17	M Fruend	Benalla	16	Rusty McDonald	Wang Rovers	13
1960	Roy Symes	Benalla	14	Brian Kealy	Wodonga	13	Alan Jones	Wodonga	
1961	John Dormer	Corowa	17	Dom Glassenbury	Wodonga	14	Rusty McDonald	Wang Rovers	12
1962	Mick Seymour	Corowa	14	John Dwyer	Wodonga	13	Jim Hayes	Wangaratta	10
							Jeff Hemphill	Wangaratta	10
1963	Ron Wales	Wangaratta	21	Rusty McDonald	Wang Rovers	16	Dick Nottingham	Benalla	13
Les Cuddon Medal
1964	Kerry Seymour	Corowa	15	Keith Murphy &	Benalla	13	Tom Tobin	Wang Rovers	11
				Noel Richens	Wang Rovers	13			
1965	Kelvin Roberts	Albury	18	Vic Garoni	Myrtleford	16	Alan Benton &	Wangaratta	12
							R Saunders	Yarrawonga	12
1966	Mick Seymour	Corowa	13	Peter Seymour	Corowa	12	N Ross &	North Albury	11
							J Weissel	North Albury	11
1967	Alan Benton	Wangaratta							
1968	Norm Hogan*	Benalla	17	R Anderson	North Albury	16	Terry Hogan &	Wang Rovers	13
	Alan Benton	Wangaratta	(17)				Kerry Seymour	Corowa	13
1969	Alan Daniel*	Wang Rovers	17	John West	Wang Rovers	16	D Richmond	Yarrawonga	11&1/2
	Keith Flower	Wodonga	(17)						
1970	John "Pop" Lonergan	Yarrawonga	13	David Tighe	Wang Rovers	11			
1971	Terry Burgess	Myrtleford	16	Ray Wheildon	Yarrawonga	13			
1972	Gerald Stakelum	North Albury	16	Paul Hooper	Benalla	13	Keith Flower	Wodonga	10
							B Bourke	Yarrawonga	10
							Maguire	Myrtleford	10
1973	Graham Sherwill	Benalla	16	G Jones	Corowa	15	W McIntyre	Benalla	13
1974	W. Bill Tighe	Albury	16	Kevin Hogan	Wang Rovers	15	Neville Forge	Corowa	13
Leo Burke Medal
1975	Barry Clarke	Wang Rovers	22	Tom Cooper	Myrtleford	13	Bill White	Yarrawonga	11
							Stewart Woods	Wodonga	11
1976	Kevin Keating	Wodonga	17	Simon Plunkett	Albury	13	Bill White	Yarrawonga	12
1977	Bruce Calder	Wodonga	12	Tom Ashton	Wang Rovers	10	Neville Allan	Wang Rovers	9
				G Cleveland	Yarrawonga	10	K Chandler	Rutherglen	9
				Greg Elliott	Wang Rovers	10	N Grimmer	Benalla	9
				L Keat	Myrtleford	10			
				Simon Plunkett	Albury	10			
				D Sheather	Albury	10			
1978	Bruce Calder	Wodonga	14	Simon Plunkett	Albury	11	Neville Allan	Wang Rovers	9
							Francis Noonan	Benalla	9
							Greg Saunders	Wang Rovers	9
1979	Malcom Dalton	Wang Rovers	13	Terry Flynn	Wang Rovers	12	Rod Lavis	Corowa Rutherglen	11
1980	Trevor Essex	Yarrawonga	15	Steven Succetelli	Myrtleford	14	J Brown	Corowa Rutherglen	13
1981	Maurice Eames	Albury	11	Peter Macklan	Wodonga	10	Peter Brouwer	Albury	9
1982	Ian Gambold	Wang Rovers	10	Ray Irvine	Yarrawonga	9	Jim Britton	Wodonga	8
				Sambo Johnson	Wangaratta	9	Neil Brown	Wodonga	8
				A Stephens	Yarrawonga	9	B Hearn	Benalla	8
							R Mellington	Benalla	8
							W Bill Mulraney	North Albury	8
1983	Stephen Brown	Wodonga	13	D Holmes	Myrtleford	12	C Barton	Lavington	11
							P Macklan	North Albury	11
1984	Colin Reynolds	Wodonga	14	Craig Barton	Lavington	11	Greg Elliott	Wang Rovers	8
				Laurie Parolin	Myrtleford	11	G Mulraney	North Albury	8
				Ross Spriggs	Wangaratta	11			
1985	Paul Livingston	Corowa Rutherglen	10	Eddie Flynn &	Wang Rovers	9	G Harmer	Albury	8
				Gary Essex	Yarrawonga	9	Peter Wolk	Albury	8
				Jeff Ramsdale	Yarrawonga	9	Mark Waite	Wodonga	8
1986	Rod Lavis	Corowa Rutherglen	23	Ross Worley	Wangaratta	14	Tony Heather	Albury	11
1987	Paul Potocnik	Albury	18	Karl Bounader	Wodonga	14	Sambo Johnson	Wangaratta	11
1988	W. Bill Mulraney	North Albury	14	Gary O'Keefe	Wang Rovers	11	Steven Bowdren	Albury	10
							Paul Potocnik	Albury	10
1989	Andrew Robinson	Wanga Rovers	20	Mark Stephens	Wodonga	13	Richard Braid	North Albury	12
1990	James Houston	Albury	17	Jason Reid	Wodonga	15	Peter Copley &	Lavington	13
							Ken Mansell	Lavington	13
1991	Mick Thornycroft	North Albury	16	Darren Flashman	Lavington	13	Phil Godde	Corowa Rutherglen	11
				R McIntosh	Wodonga Raiders	13	Robbie Johnson	Benalla	11
1992	Anthony Gleeson &	Wangaratta	17	Ian Bock	Corowa Rutherglen	16	Jim Sandral	Corowa Rutherglen	14
	Robert Lampre &	Wodonga Raiders	17						
	Brendan Smith	Wodonga	17						
1993	Chris Barker	Wodonga	13	Richie Baker	Corowa Rutherglen	11	Tony Gleeson	Wangaratta	10
							Gerard Knobel	Myrtleford	10
							Steven Masin	Myrtleford	10
							Paul Mooney	Paul Mooney	10
1994	W. Bill Mulraney	North Albury	17	Brad Marshall	Wodonga Raiders	13	Trevor Vyner	Wodonga	11
1995	Dale Gleeson	Wodonga Raiders	17	Shane Roche	Myrtleford	15	Mick Brunner	Albury	13
1996	Scott Burgess &	Myrtleford	24	Shane Keegan	Lavington	18	Cameron Bakes	Albury	15
	Matthew Garoni	Myrtleford	24						
1997	Craig McMillan &	Lavington	17	Jason Reid	Wodonga	11	Danny Cohen	Wodonga	10
	Graham McMillan	Yarrawonga	17				S Davey	North Albury	10
							Shane Roche	Wang Rovers	10
							Kurt Schubert	Wodonga Raiders	10
1998	Ralph Albers	Lavington	19	J Baker &	Wodonga Raiders	12	J Reid	Wodonga	11
				B Braybrook	Wodonga	12			
1999	Ben Kerr	North Albury	21	Matt Prendergast	Wodonga Raiders	20	Shannon Gilson	North Albury	16
2000	Shane Wardrop	North Albury	14	Graeme Fruean	Albury	13	Tony Geddes	North Albury	11
				Nathan Haywood	Lavington	13	Ian Maiden	Lavington	11
2001	Paul Wood	Albury	17	A Loughman		15	A Gilbert		14
2002	Paul Wood	Albury	18	Ryan Storey	Wodonga	17	Shane Forge	Yarrawonga	12
							Peter Fraser	Wodonga	12
2003	Col McClounan	Wangaratta	24	Troy Walker	Wang Rovers	14			
2004	C Miller	Albury							
2005	Graham Mathey	Wodonga	15	Scott Oliver	Wang Rovers	14	Travis Hubble	Wang Rovers	13
2006	Carl Norton	Wangaratta	22	Ben McIntyre	Myrtleford	16	Scott Oliver	Wang Rovers	15
							Joshua Pierpoint	Albury	15
2007	Carl Norton	Wangaratta	25	John Poala	Wodonga Raiders	19	Tim Scheuermann	Wang Rovers	18
2008	Carl Norton	Wangaratta	20	Sam Duck	Albury	15	Paul Scullie	Wang Rovers	
2009	Luke Daly	Albury	27	Trent Lappin	Wang Rovers	23	Steven Pulla	Wodonga Raiders	18
2010	Carl Norton &	Wangaratta	19	David Avery	Wodonga	17			
	Brandon Symes	Yarrawonga	19						
2011	Carl Norton	Wangaratta	25	Dan McCormack &	Wangaratta	15			
2012	Nathan Lafoe	Wodonga Raiders	20	Nick Howell	Myrtleford	18	Dylan Beattie	Wodonga	17
2013	Ross Mulquiney &	Yarrawonga	14	Jack Stefani	Wodonga	13	Will Blomeley	Albury	12
	Ashleigh Sibraa	North Albury	14				Beau Seymour	Yarrawonga	12
	Ben Dower*	Albury	(14)						
2014	Bobby Griffiths	Albury	21	Will Haberecht	Albury	16	Damon Symes	Yarrawonga	14
2015	Craig Mabon	Lavington	18	Bryce Garvey	Wodonga	15	James McClounan	Wangaratta	11
				Guy Prendergast	Lavington	15			
2016	Clint Gilson &	North Albury	23	Jack Haugen	Wodonga Raiders	17	Ben Dower	Albury	15
	Ross Mulquiney	Yarrawonga	23						
2017	Clint Gilson	North Albury	17	Nick English	Wodonga	13	Jeremy Schifferle	Myrtleford	12
2018	Oliver McEwan	Albury	22	Aiden Bihun &	Wangaratta	15			
				Reece Corcoron	Wodonga Raiders				
2019	Ross Mulquiney	Yarrawonga	27	Oliver McEwan	Albury	24	Jeremy Schifferle	Myrtleford	18
2020	In recess COVID-19								
2021	Mitchell Booth	Wang Rovers	16	Angus Geddes	Albury	9			
				Chris Knowles	Wangaratta	9			
				Max Hemphill	Yarrawonga	9			
2022	Xavier Leslie	Yarrawonga	26	Mitch Booth	Wang Rovers	24	Kade Brown	Wodonga	13
2023	Jacob Brunner	Albury	27	Will Bradshaw	Wodonga	13	Will Robinson	Yarrawonga	11
2024	Noah Amery	Wang Rovers	24	Braeden Marjanovic	Wangaratta	21	Will Haberecht	Albury	17
2025	Harry Barber	Lavington	16	Sam Comensoli	Wangaratta Rovers	14	Deklan Yates	Corowa Rutherglen	13
2026	Max Bihun	Wangaratta	17	Harrison McCarthy	Wangaratta Rovers	15	Wade Knights	Wodonga Raiders	14
Year	Winner	Club	Votes	Second	Club	Votes	Third	Club	Votes

- 1954 – K Teakle won on a countback. Aitken & Purss, both polled 9 votes in this award, but lost on a count back and received a retrospective medal in 2024.
- 1957 – Norm Hawking (Rutherglen) also won the 1951 O&MFL Morris Medal too.
- 1968 – Norm Hogan won on a countback. Alan Benton lost on a count back and received a retrospective medal in 2024.
- 1969 – Alan Daniel won on a countback. Flower lost on a count back and received a retrospective medal in 2024.
- 1971 winner, Terry Burgess & 1996 winner, Scott Burgess are father and son.
- 2013 – Ben Dower (Albury) was ineligible to win after being suspended during the home and away series.
- 2022 – Xavier Leslie (Yarrawonga) also won the 2013 O&MFNL Morris Medal too.

=== Football: Under 18 / Thirds Best and Fairest ===
The Thirds / Under 18 competition commenced in 1973 and the Leo Dean Medal is awarded for the best and fairest thirds football player in the O&MFL during the home and away season. This award was originally called the 3NE Award for the Thirds competition inaugural year in 1973 to 1984.

Leo Andrew Dean was a talented young former Wangaratta player who died on Monday, 3 September 1984, at 20 years of age and this award is in memory of him.

U/18's:	Leo Dean Award								
Year	Winner	Club	Votes	Second	Club	Votes	Third	Club	Votes
3NE Award
1973	Peter Nolan	Benalla	26	Paddy McCarthy	Wang Rovers	17	R Brizzi	Myrtleford	16
							L Chalmers	Myrtleford	16
							John Dent	Wangaratta	16
							A Monshing		16
1974	Mick Ketchup	Wangaratta	32	Peter Nolan	Benalla	24	Peter Duncan	Yarrawonga	20
1975	Steven Hedley	Wodonga	21	Phil Murray	Wangaratta	20	V Ryan	Yarrawonga	19
1976	John Martiniello	Benalla	24	Anthony Carroll	Corowa	17	P Cody	Rutherglen	16
1977	A McIntosh	North Albury	28	N Johntson	Myrtleford	18	G Long	Yarrawonga	17
1978	John Clohessey	Corowa	20	Greg Pritchard	Wangaratta	19	A Mapleson	Corowa	14
1979	John Pennington	Wodonga	17	David Johnston	North Albury	16	Wayne Edwards	North Albury	15
1980	Anthony McTavish	North Albury	34	Daryl Everett	Wangaratta	20	Fred Pane &	Wang Rovers	19
							Gary Essex	Yarrawonga	19
1981	Brian Judd	Yarrawonga	19	Steven Bowdren	Albury	18	Paul Livingston	Corowa Rutherglen	17
				Laurie Cook	Benalla	18			
				Fred Pane	Wang Rovers	18			
1982	Ian McGregor	Wodonga	24	Mick Reidy	Wang Rovers	23	Steven Hickey	Benalla	22
1983	Rod Brewster*	Benalla	19	Anthony Pasquali	Wang Rovers	17	Brad Boundy	Corowa Rutherglen	16
	Michael Moore	Myrtleford	(19)						
1984	Chris O'Connor	Wang Rovers	17	Paul Bryce	Wang Rovers	16	John Aliozas	Myrtleford	15
Leo Dean Award
1985	John Pulling*	Corowa Rutherglen	15	Martin Cross &	North Albury	14	C Knobel	Myrtleford	13
	Paul Greaves	Benalla	(15)	Chris Hoysted &	Wang Rovers	14	Tom Runnalls Jnr	Yarrawonga	13
				Paul Minall	Albury	14			
1986	Tom Runnalls Jnr	Yarrawonga	20	P Linea	Wodonga	16	D Fraser	Corowa Rutherglen	12
							John Galie	Wang Rovers	12
1987	Greg Knobel	Myrtleford	20	C Bergin	Lavington	19	J Batson	Lavington	16
1988	Paul Weir	Corowa Rutherglen	19	Michael Killeen	Lavington	16	Andrew Robinson	Wang Rovers	15
1989	Phillip Partington	Wodonga Raiders	12	Stephen Bice	Albury	11	Cameron Bakes	Albury	10
	Daine Hochfeld*	Wang Rovers	(13)	Matthew Garoni	Myrtleford	11	Jason Dowling	Wang Rovers	10
				Chris Gleason	Albury	11	Robert Lampre	Wodonga Raiders	10
				S Maloney	North Albury	11	Mark Nolan	Wang Rovers	10
				Luke Norman	Wangaratta	11	S Pfahlert	Lavington	10
				John Sammutt	Benalla	11	Joel Styles	Wodonga	10
1990	David King	Albury	21	Adam Azzi	Wodonga	17	M Seymour	Yarrawonga	16
1991	Craig McBrien	Lavington	40	Mark Dawson	Wodonga Raiders	21	Paul Hodgkin	Wodonga	18
1992	Mark Knobel	Myrtleford	23	Hayden Sharp	Wang Rovers	22	Robbie Murray	North Albury	20
1993	Phil Jones	North Albury	28	Aaron McGibbon	Lavington	20	Brett Kirk	North Albury	19
				Robert Reeve	Wodonga Raiders	20	Matthew Lewis	Benalla	19
1994	Dean Taylor	North Albury	18	Nathan Powell	Lavington	16	Brad Doolan	Wodonga	15
1995	Matthew Collins	Albury	27	Bill Neely	Yarrawonga	19	Kane Arendarckas	Albury	17
1996	Daniel McLaughlin	Wang Rovers	22	Daniel Harders	Albury	19	M Wright	Benalla	19
				Troy McCormack	Wangaratta	19			
1997	Aaron Henneman	Corowa Rutherglen	18	B Collins	Benalla	14	Justin Knobel	Myrtleford	13
				B Eames	Albury	14	S Pierce	Woodonga Raiders	13
				P Hicks	Corowa Rutherglen	14	Rohan Rosser	Wang Rovers	13
1998	Justin Knobel	Myrtleford	27	Troy Walker	Wang Rovers	24	N Reynoldson	Corowa Rutherglen	20
1999	Dean Bigger &	Yarrawonga	21	Larn Dougangphosay	Wang Rovers	20	B Sutcliffe	Albury	18
	Ian Maiden	Lavington	21						
2000	Ryan McKenzie	Corowa-Rutherglen	26	Daine Runnells	Yarrawonga	25	Hayden Heta	Wodonga	22
							Steve Johnson	Wangaratta	22
2001	Ryan McEvoy	Wodonga	23	Paul Glanville		17	R Hynes		15
2002	Jamie Allan &	Wang Rovers	25	C Miller	Albury	24	K Buis	Myrtleford	16
	Trent Ball	Lavington	25						
2003	Ben Sanday	Wodonga Raiders	24	Carl Groth	Wang Rovers	21			
2004	James Weavers	North Albury	36	Carl Groth	Wang Rovers	23	Matthew Seiter	Wodonga	22
2005	Todd Birch &	North Albury	21	T Gleeson	Albury	18	T Gorupic	Wodonga	13
	Ben Reid	Wang Rovers	21				M McEvoy	Wodonga Raiders	13
							Brent Newton	Wang Rovers	13
2006	Peter Cook	Wodonga Raiders	24	Matthew Flynn &	Wang Rovers	18	Luke Griffin	Wangaratta	14
				Shane Gaston	Wang Rovers	18			
2007	Zac O'Brien &	Wang Rovers	18	Jarrod Hodgkin	Wodonga	15	Matthew Flynn	Wang Rovers	14
	Brenton Olsen	Wodonga	18	Heath Ohlin	Wodonga Raiders	15	Josh Hammond	Yarrawonga	14
							Josh Owen	Wangaratta	14
2008	Jack Stean	Albury	21	Danny Allan	Wang Rovers	20			
2009	Angus McDiarmid	Lavington	23	Josh McCudden	Wodonga Raiders	19	Brandon Symes	Yarrawonga	14
2010	Matt Dussin	Alpine Eagles	21	James Backway	Wodonga	20	Brody Ricardi	Alpine Eagles	18
2011	Will Blomeley &	Albury							
	Connor Hargreaves	Yarrawonga							
2012	B Murphy	Wodonga Raiders					Dylan Wilson	Wang Rovers	17
2013	Damon Symes &	Yarrawonga	15						
	Louis Vescio	Wangaratta	15						
2014	Hugh Amery	Wangaratta	23	Aaron Jory	Lavington	22	Dominic Brew	Albury	21
2015	Hugh Amery	Wangaratta	29	Ben Lloyd	North Albury	20	Brad Coyne	Corowa Rutherglen	17
2016	Paul Sanderson	Wang Rovers							
2017	Paul Sanderson	Wang Rovers	26	Adam Martin	Lavington	18	Riley Bice	Albury	17
2018	Ed Dayman	Wang Rovers	20	Ben Bray	Wangaratta	17	Jack Sexton	Yarrawonga	15
2019	Alessandro Belci &	Wang Rovers	26	Isaac Folini	Wangaratta	18			
	Oscar Hayes	Albury	26						
2020	In recess. COVID-19								
2021	Ben Woodburn	Yarrawonga	25	Thomas Cappellari	Myrtleford	15	Alex McCarthy	Wang Rovers	14
2022	Charlie Lappin	Albury	20	Nelson Bowey	Wodonga Raiders	16	Charlie McGrath	Albury	13
2023	Riley Allan	Wang Rovers	22	Will Ashton &	Wang Rovers	18	Corby Robertson &	Lavington	17
				Rueben Bourke	Wodonga	18	Archer Scammell	Wodonga Raiders	17
2024	James Grohmann	Wodonga	22	Cooper Hall	Lavington	19	Oscar Roberts	Wangaratta	18
2025	Cooper Hall	Lavington	30	Cooper Bowman	Wang Rovers	22	Riley Costello	Lavington	20
2026	Cooper Bowman	Wang Rovers	18	Blake Morgan	Albury	17	Max Collins &	Wodonga	16
							Jed Marek	Wang Rovers	16
2027									
Year	Winner	Club	Votes	Second	Club	Votes	Third	Club	Votes

- 1983 – Rod Brewster (Benalla) won on a countback. Michael Moore (Myrtleford) lost on a count back, but did receive a retrospective medal in 2023.
- 1985 – John Pulling (Corowa Rutherglen) won on a countback. Paul Greaves (Benalla) lost on a count back, but did receive a retrospective medal in 2023.
- 1989 – Daine Hochfeld (Wangaratta Rovers) polled the most votes, but was deemed ineligible due to a two-week suspension for abusive language during the home and away series.
- 1991 – Craig McBrien (Lavington) polled 13 x three votes.
- 1998 – Myrtleford brothers, Greg, Mark and Justin Knobel have all won a O&MFNL Thirds best and fairest award.
- Leo Dean Medalists, Ryan McKenzie and Jamie Allan, both went onto win a senior O&MFNL football best and fairest, Morris Medal.

== Media Awards ==
The following senior O&MFNL footballer have won these various local media awards. The awards lists below have been complied by O&MFNL Historian, Kevin B. Hill.

Border Morning Mail Newspaper - O&MFNL Senior Footballer of the Year Award

- 1955 - Rex Bennett: Corowa
- 1960 - Jim Sandral: Corowa
- 1974 - Rodney Graeber: Wodonga
- 1980 - Vin Doolan: Wangaratta
- 1981 - Evan Connick - Wodonga
- 1982 - Peter Sharp: Wodonga
- 1983 - Bruce Stewart: Lavington
- 1984 - Rudy Yonson: North Albury
- 1985 - Denis Sandral: Corowa Rutherglen
- 1986 - Les Parish: Yarrawonga
- 1987 - Steven Clarke: North Albury
- 1988 - John O'Donohue: Wangaratta Rovers
- 1989 - John Brunner: Yarrawonga
- 1990 - Drew Pevitt: Wodonga
- 1991 - Rob Walker: Wangaratta Rovers
- 1992 - Steven Murphy: Wodonga
- 1993 - Steven Clarke: Wodonga Raiders &
  Rob Walker: Wangaratta Rovers
- 1994 - John Kingston: Corowa Rutherglen
- 1995 - Glenn Page: Albury
- 1996 - No Award. In recess
- 1997 - Rob Walker: Wangaratta Rovers
- 1998 - Brett Kirk: North Albury
- 1999 - Corey Lambert: North Albury
- 2000 - Jason McFarlene: Albury
- 2001 - Rob Walker: Wangaratta Rovers
- 2002 - Darryn McKimmie: Lavington
- 2003 - Rob Walker: Wangaratta Rovers
- 2004 - Simon McCormick: Wodonga &
  David Lucas: Corowa/Rutherglen
- 2005 - Jason Lappin: Wangaratta
- 2006 - Kade Stevens: Lavington
- 2007 - Jonathon McCormick: Wangaratta
- 2008 - Jake Ryan: Corowa Rutherglen
- 2009 - Shaun Daly: Albury
- 2010 - Jamie Allan: Wangaratta &
  Chris Hyde: Albury
- 2011 - Shaun Daly: Albury
- 2012 - Joel Mackie: Albury
- 2013 - Chris Hyde: Albury
- 2014 - Brayden O'Hara: Albury
- 2015 - Joel Mackie: Albury
- 2016 - Christian Burguess: Myrtleford &
  Matt Seiter: Wodonga
- 2016 - Last year of this award.

1566 3NE Radio - O&MFNL Senior Footballer of the Year Award

- 1974 - Jack O'Halloran: Wangaratta
- 1975 - Jack O'Halloran: Wangaratta
- 1976 - Jack O'Halloran: Wangaratta
- 1977 -
- 1978 -
- 1979 - Peter Howard: Myrtleford
- 1980 - Mark Mills: Corowa/Rutherglen
- 1982 - Peter Sharp: Wodonga
- 1983 - Bruce Stewart: Lavington
- 1984 - Rudy Yonson: North Albury
- 1985 - Terry Greaves: Benalla
- 1986 - Les Parish: Yarrawonga
- 1987 - Gary McGhee: Wodonga
- 1988 - John O'Donohue: Wang Rovers
- 1989 - Peter Tossol: Wangaratta Rovers
- 1990 - Drew Pevitt: Wodonga
- 1991 - Rob Walker: Wangaratta Rovers
- 1992 - Neville Shaw: Lavington
- 1993 - Brian Kelly: Albury
- 1994 - Michael James: Wangaratta
- 1995 - Glenn Page: Albury
- 1996 - Paul Atkins: Myrtleford
- 1997 - Rob Walker: Wangaratta Rovers
- 1998 - Mark Lambertini: Myrtleford
- 1999 - Corey Lambert: North Albury
- 2000 - Jason McFarlene: Albury
- 2000 - Last year of this award.

101.3 WPRFM Radio - O&MFNL Senior Footballer of the Year Award

- 2001 - Rob Walker: Wangaratta Rovers
- 2002 - Christin Macri: Wodonga Raiders
- 2003 - Rob Walker: Wangaratta Rovers

101.3 OAKFM Radio - O&MFNL Senior Footballer of the Year Award

- 2004 - Simon McCormick: Wodonga &
  David Lucas: Corowa/Rutherglen
- 2005 - Andrew Carey: Myrtleford
- 2006 - Kade Stevens: Lavington
- 2007 - Jonathon McCormick: Wangaratta
- 2008 - Paul Kirby: Wangaratta
- 2009 - Jonathon McCormick: Wangaratta
- 2010 - Shaun Daly: Albury
- 2011 - Shaun Daly: Albury
- 2012 - Joel Mackie: Albury
- 2013 - Xavier Leslie: Yarrawonga
- 2014 - Kristin Height: Myrtleford
- 2015 - Nick Holman: North Albury
- 2016 - Matthew Seiter: Wodonga
- 2017 - Mark Whiley: Yarrawonga
- 2018 - Jydon Neagle: Wodonga Raiders
- 2019 - Shaun Daly: Albury
- 2020 - O&MFNL in recess > COVID-19
- 2021 - Isaac Muller: Wodonga Raiders
- 2022 - Joe Richards: Wangaratta
- 2023 - Willie Wheeler: Yarrawonga
- 2024 - Isaac Muller: Albury
- 2025 - Tim Broomhead: North Albury
- 2026 - Riley Smith: Myrtleford

1494 2AY Radio / O&M Live - O&MFNL Footballer of the Year award

- 2023 - Cameron Wilson: Yarrawonga
- 2024 - Isaac Muller: Albury
- 2025 - Charlie Thompson: Wangaratta Rovers
- 2026 - Joel Stevens: Wangaratta

== O&MFNL – Rising Star of the Year ==
The O&MFNL Rookie of the Year was first awarded in 1987.

- Rookie of the Year 1987 to 1994
- The Richard Hamilton Award (Rising Star of the Year) was first awarded in 2003.
- 1987: John Longmire: Corowa Rutherglen
- 1988: Chris Naish: Wangaratta
- 1989: Ben Doolan: Albury
- 1990: Clinton Cole: North Albury
- 1991: Damian Houlihan: Corowa Rutherglen
- 1992: Adrian Whitehead: Wodonga
- 1993: Trent Montgomery: Wangaratta
- 1994: Matthew Fowler: Albury
- 1995: No award ?
- 1996: No award ?
- 1997: No award ?
- 1998: David Willett: Corowa Rutherglen
- 1999: Joshua Cross: Albury
- 2000: Cory Brown: Lavington
- 2001: Matthew Prendergast: Lavington
- 2002: Andrew Carey: Myrtleford
- 2003: Matthew Dwyer: Wangaratta Rovers
- 2004: Daine Porter: Wangaratta
- 2005: Mark Tyrell: Yarrawonga
- 2006: Craig Lieschke: Wodonga
- 2007: Jack Ziebell: Wodonga
- 2008: Todd Bryant: Wodonga Raiders
- 2009: Jared Worsteling: Wodonga
- 2010: Luke McNeil: Lavington
- 2011: Nico Sedgwick: Lavington
- 2012: Hayden Filliponi: Corowa Rutherglen
- 2013: Alex Marklew: Wangaratta Rovers
- 2014: Josh Minogue: North Albury
- 2015: Marcus Hargreaves: Yarrawonga
- 2016: Brad Melville Wangaratta
- 2017: Joe Richards Wangaratta
- 2018: Darcy Chellew: Myrtleford
- 2019: Ky Williamson: Wangaratta Rovers
- 2020: O&M in recess. COVID-19
- 2021: Josh Mathey: Wodonga
- 2022: Isaac McGrath: Albury
- 2023: Nelson Bowey: Wodonga Raiders
- 2024: Jack Costello: Lavington
- 2025: Noah Scholte: Wangaratta Rovers

== Leading Football Goal Kicker ==
Seniors: Doug Strang Medalists (1893–2026)

The Doug Strang Medal is given for the leading goal kicker senior player in the O&MFL during the home and away season at a vote count held in the week preceding the grand final.

The award is similar to the AFL's Coleman Medal.

The award was known as the Jeffrey Trophy in 1957.

From 1966 to 1969, the goalkicking award was known as the Ivan Hanrahan Trophy.

In 1970 the goalkicking award was the Garrison Hotel Trophy.

The medal was later named in honour of former, Albury and Richmond player, Doug Strang

The list of Doug Strang Medallists follows:

() – Brackets means goals kicked in finals series.

- 1893: G. Thompson (Beechworth)
  and H.Wilkinson (Rutherglen)
- 1894: J. Buckley (Beechworth)
- 1895: J. Anderson (Rutherglen)
- 1896: ?. Whiteoak (Rutherglen)
- 1897: ?
- 1898: ?
- 1899: Fred Hiskins (Excelsior) 31
- 1900: J. Buckley (Beechworth)
- 1901: ?. Martin (Rutherglen)
- 1902: Ernie Dunne (Albury)
- 1903: ?. Farrell (Border United)
- 1904: ?
- 1905: G.Gillbert (Rutherglen)
- 1906: ?
- 1907: G.Gillbert (Rutherglen)
- 1908: ?
- 1909: G.O'Keefe (Rutherglen)
- 1910: Stewart (Albury) 10
- 1911: ?
- 1912: ?
- 1913: T. Howell (Rutherglen)
- 1914: Reben Rixon (Albury) 35
- 1915: T. Howell (Rutherglen)
- 1916: Recess – World War I
- 1917: Recess – World War I
- 1918: Recess – World War I
- 1919: Cyril Ready (Lake Rovers)
- 1920: League in Recess
- 1921: – Len McInerney (St. Patrick's)
- 1922: – Len McInerney (St. Patrick's)
- 1923: Fred Beeson (Benalla) 61 (5) = 66
- 1924: – Les Hill (Benella) 38
- 1925: – F Roach (Albury)
- 1926: – Les Hill (Benalla)
- 1927: Len McInerney (St Patricks)78 (19) = 97
- 1928: Percy Jones (Hume Weir) 104 (0) = 104
- 1928: C "Snowy" Osborne (Albury) 104
- 1929: – J Hore (East Albury)
- 1930: – Gordon Strang (East Albury)
- 1931: Ray "Nana" Baker (Corowa – 74)
- 1932: Ray "Nana" Baker (Corowa – ?) 45
- 1933: Leo Nolan (Wangaratta – 85)
- 1934: Charlie Heavey (Wangaratta 80
- 1935: Charlie Heavey (Wangaratta 98 (11) = 109)
- 1936: Fred Matthews (Wodonga)109 (14) = 123
- 1937: Keith Thompson (Wangaratta) 64
- 1938: Doug Strang (Albury – 126)
- 1939: Doug Strang (Albury) – 103 (14) = 117
- 1940: R.Skinner (Yarrawonga) 62 +8 = 70
- 1941: Recess – World War II
- 1942: Recess – World War II
- 1943: Recess – World War II
- 1944: Recess – World War II
- 1945: Recess – World War II
- 1946: Ernie Ward (Wangaratta) 64
- 1947:Bob Chitty (Benalla) 72 (14) = 86
- 1948:Harold Shain (Albury) 62
- 1949:Bob Chitty (Benalla) 68 (72)
- 1950: Max Williams (Wangaratta) 82
- 1951:Max Williams (Wangaratta) 92
- 1952:Kevin Gleeson (Rutherglen) 106
- 1953:Jim Matthews (Albury) 67
- 1954:Frank “Dolly” Aked (Yarrawonga) 80 (83)
- 1955:Frank "Dolly" Aked (Yarrawonga) 77
- 1956:Lester Yensch (North Albury) 71
- 1957:Lance Oswald (Yarrawaonga) 84 (11) = 95
- 1958:Jack McDonald (Wangaratta) 68
- 1959:D. O'Connell (Albury) 72
- 1960:Bob Rose Wangaratta Rovers 57 &
- 1960: Bob Constable (Wangaratta 57
- 1961:Bob West (Wodonga) 60
- 1962:Bob West (Wodonga) 59
- 1963:Stan Sargeant (North Albury) 54
- 1964:Fred Goldsmith (Albury) 81
- 1965:Stan Sargeant (North Albury) 65
- 1966:Stan Sargeant (North Albury) 76
- 1967:Geoff Scott (Wangaratta) 90 (2) = 92
- 1968:Stan Sargeant (North Albury) 72
- 1969:Terry Smith (Wodonga) 68
- 1970:Terry Smith (Wodonga) 80
- 1971:Stan Sargeant (North Albury) 87
- 1972:Vern Drake (Benalla) 111
- 1973:Steve Norman (Wang Rovers) 79 (18) = 97
- 1974:Stan Sargeant (North Albury) 104
- 1975:Steve Norman (Wang Rovers) 118 (3) – 121
- 1976:Vern Drake (North Albury) 79
- 1977:Steve Norman (Wang Rovers) 103
- 1978:Steve Norman (Wang Rovers) 103
- 1979:George Tobias (Corowa Rutherglen) 69
- 1980:Brian Parks (North Albury) 109
- 1981:David Turner (Wodonga) ?
- 1982:Daryl Bakes (Albury) 108
- 1983:Daryl Bakes (Albury) &
  Peter Ruscuklic (Myrtleford) 76
- 1984:Ross Flanigan (Yarrawonga) 88
- 1985:Steve Jones (Yarrawonga) 106
- 1986:Steve Adamo (Wangaratta) 106
- 1987:Steve Adamo (Wangaratta) 101
- 1988:Paul McCarty (Myrtleford) 74
- 1989:Paul McCarty (Myrtleford) 76
- 1990:Brendan Cornell (Corowa-Rutherglen)72
- 1991:Neale McMonigle (Wang Rovers) 75 (87)
- 1992:Join Henry (Wangaratta) 82
- 1993:Shane Dryden (Wodonga Raiders) 112
- 1993:Mark Stockdale (Wodonga)107 (10) = 117
- 1994:Shane Dryden (Wodonga Raiders) 111
- 1995:Brenton Cooper (Wodonga) 114
- 1996:Chris Stuhldreier (Lavington) 116
- 1997:Chris Stuhldreier (Lavington) 114 (119)
- 1997 Michael McGregor (Wodonga) 109
- 1998:Chris Stuhldreier (Lavington) 102
- 1999:Chris Stuhldreier (Lavington) 54 &
- 1999:M Warry (North Albury) 54
- 2000:Darren Bradshaw (Wodonga) 75
- 2001:Brendan Hehir (North Albury) 82
- 2002:Jason Daniltchenko (Corowa-Rutherglen) 61
- 2003: Damian Lang (Wangaratta) 63
- 2004: Damian Lang (Wangaratta) 88
- 2005: Craig Millar (Myrtleford) 74
- 2006: Tim Hargreaves (Yarrawonga) 78
- 2007: Adam Prior (North Albury) 67
- 2008: Lee Schmidt (Corowa-Rutherglen) 67
- 2009: Adam Prior (Wodonga Raiders) 79 (N/A)
- 2010: Anthony Pierri (Wodonga Raiders) 64 (7)
- 2011: Matthew Fowler (Albury) 53
- 2012: Patrick Rose (Wodonga Raiders) 101 (104)
- 2012: Brendan Fevola (Yarrawonga) 100 (110) 2nd
- 2013: Adam Prior (North Albury) 71 = 74
- 2014: Setanta Ó hAilpín (Albury) 103 (13) = 116
- 2015: Adam Prior (Lavington) 72 (7) = 79
- 2016: Josh Mellington (Albury) 106 (7) = 113
- 2017: Josh Mellington (Albury) 90 (9) = 99
- 2018: Michael Newton (Wangaratta) 66 (15) = 81
- 2019: Lachie Dale (Myrtleford) 54 (5) = 59
- 2020: O&M in recess due to the COVID-19 pandemic
- 2021: Michael Newton (Wangaratta) 44 &
- 2021: Jacob Conlan (Albury) 44
- 2022: Leigh Williams (Yarrawonga) 67 (11) = 78
- 2023: Callum Moore (Wangaratta) 75 (6) = 81
- 2024: Josh Minogue (North Albury) 61 (11) = 72
- 2025: Kaelan Bradtke (Corowa Rutherglen) 62 = 62
- 2026: Tim Oosterhoff (Lavington) 64 = 64

Most times leading goalkickers

- 6 – Stan Sargeant – North Albury
- 4 – Steve Norman – Wangaratta Rovers
- 4 – Chris Stuhldreier – Lavington
- 4 - Adam Prior - North Albury, Wodonga Raiders,

Most centuries of goals kicked

- 3 – Steve Norman – Wangaratta Rovers
- 3 – Chris Stuhldreier – Lavington

Most career goals kicked

- 1096 – Stan Sargeant; 289 games; 3.79 goals per game. North Albury
- 1016 – Steve Norman; 242 games; 4.19 goals per game. Wangaratta Rovers

Most individual goals kicked in a match

- 23 - C. "Snowy" Osborne, Albury v Corowa, 1928.
- 20 - Doug Strang, Rd.13 - Albury v Corowa, 1939
- 20 - Chris Stuhldreier, Rd.7 - Lavington v Wangaratta, 1997

Reserves: Goalkicking Award (1953–2026)
- 1953: ?
- 1954: ?
- 1955: ?
- 1956: ?
- 1957: ?
- 1958: ?
- 1959: ?
- 1960: ?
- 1961: ?
- 1962: ?
- 1963: ?
- 1964: ?
- 1965: ?
- 1966: ?
- 1967: ?
- 1968: ?
- 1969: ?
- 1970: ?
- 1971: Don Spencer (Corowa)
- 1972:
- 1973: J Trewin (Benalla) 46
- 1974:
- 1975:
- 1976:
- 1977:
- 1978:
- 1979:
- 1980: Malcom Dalton (Wang Rovers)
- 1981:
- 1982:
- 1983: Steven Prosser (Albury) 47
- 1984: Wayne Thomas (Albury) 51
- 1985: Wayne Thomas (Albury) 49
- 1986: Rod Lavis (Corowa/Rutherglen) 88
- 1987: Jeff Elkington (Wodonga) 47
- 1988: S O'Connell (Corowa/Rutherglen) 60
- 1989: Peter Westlands (North Albury) 58
- 1990: Travis Wayman (Wangaratta Rovers) 74
- 1991: C Barkley (Corowa Rutherglen) 52
- 1992: C Barker (Wodonga) 63
- 1993: Sean Lefoe (Wodonga Raiders) 91
- 1994: Stuart Thompson (Albury) 81
- 1995: Stuart Thompson (Albury) 54
- 1996: Glen Gleeson (Albury) 68 (2) = 70
- 1997: Glen Gleeson (Albury) 101
- 1998: B McEvoy (Wodonga Raiders) 61
- 1999: Andrew McDonald (Lavington) 63
- 2000: P Tucker (Albury) 55
- 2001: S Thompson (Albury) 48
- 2002: Scott Williamson(Wodonga) 51
- 2003: Rob Panozzo (Wang Rovers) 63
- 2004: R Richardson (Wodonga) 62
- 2005: D Cassidy (Wodonga) 65
- 2006: Trent Ball (Lavington) 53
- 2007: Jesse Hill (Albury) 57
- 2008: Paul Scullie (Wang Rovers) 55
- 2009: Sam Cross (Albury) 70 (1) = 71
- 2010: Matthew Grinter (Yarrawonga) 61 (10) = 71
- 2011: Nicholas Turner (Lavington 64 (2) = 66
- 2012: Daine Runnalls (Yarrawonga) 57 (4) = 61
- 2013: Sam Cross (Albury) 84 (6) = 90
- 2014: Bobby Griffiths (Albury) 96 (7) = 103
- 2015: Bobby Griffiths (Albury) 52 (1) = 53
- 2016: Matthew Grinter (Yarrawonga) 80 (0) = 80
- 2017: Darcy Laffy (Wangaratta) 66 (1) = 67
- 2018: Jackson Carmody (Albury) 62 (9) = 71
- 2019: Kolby Heiner-Hennessy (Albury) 64 (2) = 66
- 2020: O&M in recess due to the COVID-19 pandemic
- 2021: Kolby Heiner-Hennessy (Albury) 33
- 2022: Alex Dowsley (Wang Rovers) 51 (9) = 60
- 2023: Dillon Walsh-Hall (Lavington) 41 (2) = 43
- 2024: Tom Gorman (Wangaratta) 59 (5) = 64
- 2025: Oscar Cleeland (Wang Rovers) 48 (5) = 53
- 2026: Carson Way (Lavington) 41 (5) = 46

() – Brackets means goals kicked in finals series.

Thirds: Goalkicking Award: John Longmire Medal (1973–2026)
- 1973: Bruce Biggs (Benalla) 73
- 1974:
- 1975:
- 1976:
- 1977:
- 1978: Les Crawford (Wangaratta) 96 (14) = 110
- 1979:
- 1980: Craig Powell (Wodonga)
- 1981:
- 1982: David Ceglar (Wodonga) 53
- 1983: Steve Williamson (Wodonga) 51
- 1984: Paul Bryce (Wangaratta Rovers) 56
- 1985: John Pulling (Corowa Rutherglen) 74
- 1986: Brendan Smith (Wangaratta) 53 (56)
- 1987: G Zeinert (Lavington) 66
- 1988:
- 1989:
- 1990: Damian Houlihan (Corowa Rutherglen) 77
- 1991: A Wilson (Wodonga Raiders) 60
- 1992: Stephen Clayton(Wangaratta) 62
- 1993: Andrew Roberts (Wangaratta) 62
- 1994: Gary Elliott (North Albury) 62
- 1995: Glen Gleeson (Albury) 63
- 1996:Darren Bradshaw (Wodonga) 28 &
  Jack Skemmer (Wangaratta) 28 (check)
- 1997: Brendan McEvoy (Wodonga Raiders) 58
- 1998: Kane Arendarcikas (Albury) 43
- 1999: Steve Johnson (Wangaratta) 43
- 2000: Chris Canavan (Wang Rovers) 35
- 2001: Ryan McEvoy (Wodonga) 60
- 2002: Tim Lethridge (Albury) 42
- 2003: Daniel Lewis (Wang Rovers) 58
- 2004: Damian Jones (Wodonga) 30
- 2005: Joel Mansell (Wodonga) 73
- 2006: Chase Strawhorn (Yarrawonga) 56
- 2007: Chase Strawhorn (Yarrawonga) 61
- 2008: Josh Warren Marbo (Lavington) 52
- 2009: Richard Dennis (Lavington) 60 (6) = 66
- 2010: Kori Stevenson (Wodonga Raiders) 61 (4) = 65
- 2011: Joshua Roman (Wangaratta) 50 (1) = 51
- 2012: Jordan Vandenberg (Myrtleford) 59 (N/A)
- 2013: William McGrath (Albury) 83 (0) = 83
- 2014: Zach Sproule (Albury) 45 (1) = 41
- 2015: Darcy Laffy (Wangaratta) 40 (5) = 45
- 2016: Matthew Casey (Yarrawonga) 59 (2) = 61
- 2017: Fraser Judd (Wangaratta) 54 (7) = 61
- 2018: Kolby Heiner-Hennessy (Albury) 68 (7) = 75
- 2019: Ethan Redcliffe (Wodonga) 75 (2) = 77
- 2020: O&M in recess due to the COVID-19 pandemic
- 2021: Ryan Beveridge (Corowa Rutherglen) 46 (N/A)
- 2022: Ryan Beveridge (Corowa Rutherglen) 83 (11) = 94
- 2023: Corby Robertson (Lavington) 41 (6) = 47
- 2024: Oscar Cleeland (Wang Rovers) 52 (8) = 60
- 2025: Branden Parkin (Wodonga) 48 (0) = 48
- 2026: Sam Trembarth (Yarrawonga) 61 (2) = 63

() – Brackets means goals kicked in finals series.

== O&MFL Grand Final – Best on ground ==
It is unsure what year the Thirds and Reserves awards were first awarded.

Senior football: H.J. "Did" Simpson medalists (1991–2026)

The H.J. "Did" Simpson Medal is given for the best on ground senior player in the O&MFL during the grand final at the post match ceremony and presentations. The award is similar to the AFL's Norm Smith Medal. The list of Did Simpson medallists follows:

- 1991: Mick Caruso (Wangaratta Rovers)
- 1992: Mick Atkins (Wodonga)
- 1993: Mick Caruso (Wangaratta Rovers)
- 1994: Rob Walker (Wangaratta Rovers)
- 1995: Ken Howe (Albury)
- 1996: Stephen Ash (Albury)
- 1997: Tim Scott (Albury)
- 1998: Geoff Valentine (Wodonga Raiders)
- 1999: Corey Lambert (North Albury)
- 2000: Damian Houlihan (Corowa-Rutherglen)
- 2001: John Hunt (Lavington)
- 2002: Simon McCormick (North Albury)
- 2003: Ricky Symes (Corowa-Rutherglen)
- 2004: Matthew Shir (Wodonga)
- 2005: Corey Brown (Lavington)
- 2006: Jason Wild (Yarrawonga)
- 2007: Ed Clarke (Wangaratta)
- 2008: Sam Higgs (Wangaratta)
- 2009: Chris Hyde (Albury)
- 2010: Daniel Maher (Albury)
- 2011: Charles Gaylard (Albury)
- 2012: Craig Ednie (Yarrawonga)
- 2013: Drew Barnes (Yarrawonga)
- 2014: Connor Hargreaves (Yarrawonga)
- 2015: Joel Mackie (Albury)
- 2016: Daniel Cross (Albury)
- 2017: Michael Newton (Wangaratta)
- 2018: Dean Polo(Albury)
- 2019: Shaun Mannagh (Lavington)
- 2020: O&MFNL in recess due to COVID-19
- 2021: No finals series. Season abandoned after Rd.12 due to COVID-19
- 2022: Callum Moore (Wangaratta)
- 2023: Michael Gibbons (Yarrawonga)
- 2024: Ed Dayman (Wangaratta Rovers)
- 2025: Will Christie (Wangaratta Rovers)
- 2026: Ed Dayman (Wangaratta Rovers)

Reserves Football: VCFL Medal: 2008 to 2019. Carl Norton Medalists (2021–26)

Best on Ground Medal in Reserves grand final

- 2008 Mitchell Palmer (Lavington)
- 2009
- 2010
- 2020: O&MFNL in recess > COVID-19
- 2021: No O&MFNL finals series > COVID-19
- 2022: Jacob Atkins (Yarrawonga)
- 2023: Rory Parnell (Albury)
- 2024: Braeden Marjanovic (Wangaratta)
- 2025: Nicholas Sedgwick (Lavington)
- 2026: Justin Lewis (Wangaratta Rovers)

Thirds Football: Brett Kirk medalists (2018–2026)

Best on Ground/ VCFL Medal in Thirds grand final

- 2008 Tim Segrave (Wangaratta Rovers)
- 2009
- 2010
- 2018: Ed Dayman (Wangaratta Rovers)
- 2019:
- 2020: O&MFNL in recess > COVID-19
- 2021: No O&MFNL finals series > COVID-19
- 2022: Jedd Longmire (Corowa-Rutherglen)
- 2023: Corby Robertson (Lavington)
- 2024: Ryley Ely (Wangaratta Rovers)
- 2025: Isaiah Robertson (Lavington)
- 2026: Will Prebble (Wangaratta Rovers)

== 2007 to 2020 season senior football ladders ==
O&MFL Senior Seasons Ladders

2007 Ladder		Wins	Byes	Losses	Draws	For	Against	%	Pts
1	Wangaratta (P)	14	0	4	0	1945	1306	148.93%	56
2	Yarrawonga	14	0	4	0	1809	1215	148.89%	56
3	North Albury	12	0	6	0	1887	1485	127.07%	48
4	Wodonga	11	0	7	0	1599	1263	126.60%	44
5	Wangaratta Rovers	11	0	7	0	1682	1376	122.24%	44
6	Albury	10	0	8	0	1704	1611	105.77%	40
7	Lavington	6	0	12	0	1558	1736	89.75%	24
8	Wodonga Raiders	6	0	12	0	1361	2103	64.72%	24
9	Corowa-Rutherglen	3	0	15	0	1434	1871	76.64%	12
10	Myrtleford	3	0	15	0	1247	2260	55.18%	12

2007 Finals		Team	G	B	Pts	Team	G	B	Pts
1	Elimination	Wodonga	13	11	89	Wangaratta Rovers	11	12	78
2	Qualifying	North Albury	15	14	104	Yarrawonga	8	11	59
3	1st semi	Wodonga	16	12	108	Yarrawonga	11	13	79
4	2nd semi	North Albury	12	10	82	Wangaratta	11	6	72
5	Preliminary	Wangaratta	15	15	105	Wodonga	10	11	71
6	Grand	Wangaratta	15	10	100	North Albury	6	13	49

2008 Ladder		Wins	Byes	Losses	Draws	For	Against	%	Pts
1	Wangaratta (P)	15	0	2	1	2149	1236	173.87%	62
2	Corowa-Rutherglen	13	0	5	0	1769	1390	127.27%	52
3	Lavington	12	0	6	0	1842	1373	134.16%	48
4	Wodonga	12	0	6	0	1646	1388	118.59%	48
5	Yarrawonga	10	0	8	0	1905	1572	121.18%	40
6	Albury	9	0	8	1	1652	1532	107.83%	38
7	Wangaratta Rovers	8	0	10	0	1679	1441	116.52%	32
8	North Albury	8	0	10	0	1779	1665	106.85%	32
9	Wodonga Raiders	2	0	16	0	1080	2264	47.70%	8
10	Myrtleford	0	0	18	0	813	2453	33.14%	0

2008 Finals		Team	G	B	Pts	Team	G	B	Pts
1	Elimination	Wodonga	11	10	76	Yarrawonga	9	12	66
2	Qualifying	Corowa-Rutherglen	11	15	81	Lavington	13	10	88
3	1st semi	Wodonga	18	8	116	Corowa-Rutherglen	10	8	68
4	2nd semi	Wangaratta	10	12	72	Lavington	8	8	56
5	Preliminary	Lavington	12	18	90	Wodonga	13	9	87
6	Grand	Wangaratta	12	14	86	Lavington	7	12	54

2009 Ladder		Wins	Byes	Losses	Draws	For	Against	%	Pts
1	Albury (P)	18	0	0	0	2383	1295	184.02%	72
2	Yarrawonga	15	0	3	0	2029	1300	156.08%	60
3	Wodonga	11	0	7	0	1851	1284	144.16%	44
4	Wangaratta	10	0	8	0	1898	1380	137.54%	40
5	Corowa-Rutherglen	9	0	9	0	1751	1480	118.31%	36
6	Lavington	9	0	9	0	1488	1592	93.47%	36
7	North Albury	8	0	10	0	1548	1612	96.03%	32
8	Wodonga Raiders	5	0	13	0	1480	1640	90.24%	20
9	Wangaratta Rovers	5	0	13	0	1366	1545	88.41%	20
10	Myrtleford	0	0	18	0	569	3235	17.59%	0

2009 Finals		Team	G	B	Pts	Team	G	B	Pts
1	Elimination	Wangaratta	17	18	120	Corowa-Rutherglen	6	13	49
2	Qualifying	Yarrawonga	17	11	113	Wodonga	15	8	98
3	1st semi	Wodonga	15	11	101	Wangaratta	13	17	95
4	2nd semi	Albury	18	16	124	Yarrawonga	10	9	69
5	Preliminary	Yarrawonga	15	10	100	Wodonga	6	11	47
6	Grand	Albury	22	13	145	Yarrawonga	9	14	68

2010 Ladder		Wins	Byes	Losses	Draws	For	Against	%	Pts
1	Albury (P)	17	0	1	0	2343	1143	204.99%	68
2	Yarrawonga	16	0	2	0	1870	1140	164.04%	64
3	North Albury	12	0	6	0	1728	1333	129.63%	48
4	Wodonga Raiders	12	0	6	0	1588	1314	120.85%	48
5	Wangaratta Rovers	9	0	9	0	1462	1378	106.10%	36
6	Wangaratta	9	0	9	0	1523	1503	101.33%	36
7	Wodonga	7	0	11	0	1441	1522	94.68%	28
8	Lavington	6	0	12	0	1419	1570	90.38%	24
9	Corowa-Rutherglen	2	0	16	0	1148	1935	59.33%	8
10	Myrtleford	0	0	18	0	746	2430	30.70%	0

2010 Finals	Team	G	B	Pts	Team	G	B	Pts
Elimination	Wodonga Raiders	13	15	93	Wangaratta Rovers	9	15	69
Qualifying	Yarrawonga	20	12	132	North Albury	3	9	27
1st semi	North Albury	17	7	109	Wodonga Raiders	9	9	63
2nd semi	Albury	3	11	29	Yarrawonga	2	6	18
Preliminary	Yarrawonga	15	16	106	North Albury	9	11	65
Grand	Albury	13	11	89	Yarrawonga	11	13	79

2011 Ladder		Wins	Byes	Losses	Draws	For	Against	%	Pts
1	Albury (P)	16	0	2	0	2397	1139	210.45%	64
2	Lavington	15	0	3	0	1749	1366	128.04%	60
3	Yarrawonga	14	0	4	0	1861	1302	142.93%	56
4	Wangaratta	11	0	7	0	1671	1378	121.26%	44
5	Wodonga Raiders	9	0	9	0	1450	1523	95.21%	36
6	North Albury	8	0	10	0	1450	1496	96.93%	32
7	Myrtleford	6	0	12	0	1165	1756	66.34%	24
8	Corowa-Rutherglen	5	0	13	0	1279	1901	67.28%	20
9	Wangaratta Rovers	4	0	14	0	1127	1549	72.76%	16
10	Wodonga	2	0	16	0	1016	1755	57.89%	8

2011 Finals	Team	G	B	Pts	Team	G	B	Pts
Elimination	Wangaratta	8	9	57	Wodonga Raiders	9	15	69
Qualifying	Lavington	8	16	64	Yarrawonga	16	5	101
1st semi	Lavington	14	22	106	Wodonga Raiders	7	5	47
2nd semi	Albury	23	6	144	Yarrawonga	16	7	103
Preliminary	Yarrawonga	13	14	92	Lavington	13	11	89
Grand	Albury	15	13	103	Yarrawonga	14	10	94

2012 Ladder	Wins	Byes	Losses	Draws	For	Against	%	Pts
Yarrawonga (P)	16	0	1	1	1769	1167	151.59%	66
Wangaratta Rovers	15	0	3	0	1672	1220	137.05%	60
Albury	13	0	5	0	2124	1357	156.52%	52
Lavington	11	0	6	1	1614	1500	107.60%	46
Wodonga Raiders	10	0	8	0	1699	1539	110.40%	40
Wodonga	6	0	12	0	1362	1631	83.51%	24
Wangaratta	5	0	13	0	1361	1562	87.13%	20
Corowa-Rutherglen	5	0	13	0	1263	1882	67.11%	20
Myrtleford	4	0	14	0	1305	1724	75.70%	16
North Albury	4	0	14	0	1325	1912	69.30%	16

2012 Finals	Team	G	B	Pts	Team	G	B	Pts
Elimination	Lavington	12	19	19	Wodonga Raiders	9	10	64
Qualifying	Wangaratta Rovers	18	9	117	Albury	15	12	102
1st semi	Albury	15	5	95	Lavington	1	13	91
2nd semi	Yarrawonga	13	10	88	Wangaratta Rovers	13	8	86
Preliminary	Albury	20	8	128	Wangaratta Rovers	15	14	104
Grand	Yarrawonga	14	9	93	Albury	12	9	81

2013 Ladder	Wins	Byes	Losses	Draws	For	Against	%	Pts
Albury	17	0	0	0	2254	1124	200.53%	68
Yarrawonga (P)	16	0	2	0	2080	1065	195.31%	64
Lavington	15	0	3	0	1819	1217	149.47%	60
Wangaratta Rovers	10	0	8	1	1415	1313	107.77%	40
North Albury	8	0	10	0	1730	1508	114.72%	32
Wangaratta	6	0	11	1	1391	1705	81.58%	26
Wodonga	5	0	13	0	1284	1560	82.31%	20
Myrtleford	5	0	13	0	1392	1924	72.35%	20
Corowa Rutherglen	4	0	13	1	1060	2068	51.26%	16
Wodonga Raiders	3	0	15	0	1191	2132	55.86%	12

2013 Finals	Team	G	B	Pts	Team	G	B	Pts
Elimination	Wangaratta Rovers	17	13	115	North Albury	16	10	106
Qualifying	Yarrawonga	15	13	103	Lavington	4	15	39
1st semi	Lavington	18	10	118	Wangaratta Rovers	4	9	33
2nd semi	Yarrawonga	16	5	101	Albury	9	15	69
Preliminary	Albury	12	6	78	Lavington	10	17	77
Grand	Yarrawonga	13	12	90	Albury	8	6	64

2014 Ladder		Wins	Byes	Losses	Draws	For	Against	%	Pts
1	Albury (P)	16	0	1	1	2625	986	266.23%	66
2	Lavington	16	0	2	0	1792	898	199.55%	64
3	Yarrawonga	15	0	2	1	2019	1157	174.50%	62
4	Corowa Rutherglen	10	0	8	0	1304	1385	94.15%	40
5	Wangaratta Rovers	8	0	10	0	1465	1568	93.43%	32
6	Wangaratta	7	0	10	1	1260	1846	68.26%	30
7	North Albury	7	0	11	0	1485	1524	97.44%	28
8	Myrtleford	5	0	13	0	1268	1793	70.72%	20
9	Wodonga Raiders	3	0	15	0	1058	2311	45.78%	12
10	Wodonga	1	0	16	1	1120	1928	58.09%	6

2014 Finals		Team	G	B	Pts	Team	G	B	Pts
1	Elimination	Wang Rovers	10	9	69	Corowa Rutherglen	8	8	56
2	Qualifying	Yarrawonga	10	9	69	Lavington	5	10	40
3	1st semi	Lavington	14	19	103	Wangaratta Rovers	10	12	72
4	2nd semi	Albury	22	7	139	Yarrawonga	11	10	76
5	Preliminary	Yarrawonga	12	16	88	Lavington	13	9	87
6	Grand	Albury	13	13	91	Yarrawonga	12	12	84

2015 Ladder		Wins	Byes	Losses	Draws	For	Against	%	Pts
1	Albury (P)	16	0	2	0	2056	1136	180.99%	64
2	Lavington	15	0	3	0	1878	953	197.06%	60
3	Wodonga Raiders	12	0	6	0	1569	1351	116.14%	62
4	North Albury	12	0	6	0	1520	1418	107.19%	40
5	Yarrawonga	10	0	8	0	1424	1259	113.11%	40
6	Wodonga	6	0	12	0	1053	1422	74.05%	24
7	Wangaratta	6	0	12	0	1254	1735	72.28%	24
8	Corowa Rutherglen	5	0	13	0	1063	1481	71.78%	20
9	Wangaratta Rovers	4	0	14	0	1222	1741	70.19%	16
10	Myrtleford	1	0	16	1	1181	1731	68.63%	16

2015 Finals		Team	G	B	Pts	Team	G	B	Pts
1	Elimination	Yarrawonga	14	17	101	North Albury	6	6	42
2	Qualifying	Lavington	17	15	117	Wodonga Raiders	7	13	55
3	1st semi	Yarrawonga	19	9	123	Wodonga Raiders	15	9	99
4	2nd semi	Albury	18	19	127	Lavington	11	4	70
5	Preliminary	Lavington	15	16	106	Yarrawonga	9	6	60
6	Grand	Albury	17	11	113	Lavington	11	18	84

2016 Ladder		Wins	Byes	Losses	Draws	For	Against	%	Pts
1	Albury (P)	16	0	2	0	2056	1136	180.99%	64
2	Lavington	15	0	3	0	1878	953	197.06%	60
3	Wodonga Raiders	12	0	6	0	1569	1351	116.14%	62
4	North Albury	12	0	6	0	1520	1418	107.19%	40
5	Yarrawonga	10	0	8	0	1424	1259	113.11%	40
6	Wodonga	6	0	12	0	1053	1422	74.05%	24
7	Wangaratta	6	0	12	0	1254	1735	72.28%	24
8	Corowa Rutherglen	5	0	13	0	1063	1481	71.78%	20
9	Wangaratta Rovers	4	0	14	0	1222	1741	70.19%	16
10	Myrtleford	1	0	16	1	1181	1731	68.63%	16

2016 Finals		Team	G	B	Pts	Team	G	B	Pts
1	Elimination	Yarrawonga	14	17	101	North Albury	6	6	42
2	Qualifying	Lavington	17	15	117	Wodonga Raiders	7	13	55
3	1st semi	Yarrawonga	19	9	123	Wodonga Raiders	15	9	99
4	2nd semi	Albury	18	19	127	Lavington	11	4	70
5	Preliminary	Lavington	15	16	106	Yarrawonga	9	6	60
6	Grand	Albury	17	11	113	Lavington	11	18	84

2017 Ladder		Wins	Byes	Losses	Draws	For	Against	%	Pts
1	Albury	17	0	1	0	2447	978	250.20%	68
2	Wangaratta (P)	14	0	4	0	1829	1202	152.16%	56
3	Yarrawonga	12	0	6	0	1971	1059	186.12%	48
4	Wodonga Raiders	12	0	6	0	1558	1212	128.55%	48
5	Lavington	11	0	7	0	1627	1282	126.91%	44
6	Wodonga	10	0	8	0	1053	1422	74.05%	40
7	Myrtleford	8	0	10	0	1547	1398	110.68%	32
8	North Albury	3	0	15	0	1100	2213	49.71%	12
9	Wangaratta Rovers	3	0	15	0	1019	2107	48.36%	12
10	Corowa Rutherglen	0	0	18	0	923	2824	32.68%	0

2017 Finals		Team	G	B	Pts	Team	G	B	Pts
1	Elimination	Lavington	14	11	95	Wodonga Raiders	7	11	53
2	Qualifying	Wangaratta	18	14	122	Yarrawonga	7	4	46
3	1st semi	Yarrawonga	13	12	90	Lavington	5	15	45
4	2nd semi	Albury	14	9	93	Wangaratta	13	8	86
5	Preliminary	Wangaratta	12	15	87	Yarrawonga	11	10	76
6	Grand	Wangaratta	16	9	105	Albury	13	6	84

2018 Ladder		Wins	Byes	Losses	Draws	For	Against	%	Pts
1	Albury (P)	18	0	0	0	2331	864	269.79%	72
2	Wodonga Raiders	15	0	3	0	2044	986	207.30%	56
3	Yarrawonga	12	0	6	0	1971	1059	186.12%	48
4	Wangaratta	14	0	4	0	1956	1076	128.55%	56
5	Lavington	9	0	8	1	1567	1069	146.59%	38
6	North Albury	7	0	10	1	1246	1508	82.63%	30
7	Wodonga	6	0	12	0	1053	1746	60.31%	24
8	Myrtleford	4	0	14	0	1059	1888	56.09%	16
9	Corowa Rutherglen	3	0	15	0	812	2021	40.18%	12
10	Wangaratta Rovers	0	0	18	0	773	2172	35.59%	0

2018 Finals		Team	G	B	Pts	Team	G	B	Pts
1	Elimination	Yarrawonga	11	11	77	Lavington	10	13	73
2	Qualifying	Wodonga Raiders	13	13	91	Wangaratta	11	10	76
3	1st semi	Wangaratta	19	12	126	Yarrawonga	11	12	78
4	2nd semi	Albury	11	16	82	Wodonga Raiders	12	8	80
5	Preliminary	Wangaratta	15	8	98	Wodonga Raiders	9	14	68
6	Grand	Albury	11	12	78	Wangaratta	10	10	70

2019 Ladder		Wins	Byes	Losses	Draws	For	Against	%	Pts
1	Lavington (P)	16	0	2	0	2122	1117	189.97%	64
2	Albury	15	0	3	0	2127	1146	185.60%	60
3	Wangaratta	15	0	3	0	1974	1100	179.45%	60
4	Myrtleford	13	0	5	0	1556	1178	132.09%	52
5	Wodonga Raiders	9	0	9	0	1576	1498	105.21%	36
6	Wangaratta Rovers	9	0	9	0	1323	1397	94.70%	36
7	Yarrawonga	7	0	11	0	1511	1517	99.60%	28
8	North Albury	3	0	15	0	1046	2262	46.24%	12
9	Corowa Rutherglen	2	0	16	0	946	1831	51.67%	8
10	Wodonga	1	0	17	0	943	2078	45.38%	4

2019 Finals		Team	G	B	Pts	Team	G	B	Pts
1	Elimination	Myrtleford	10	11	71	Wodonga	9	14	68
2	Qualifying	Wangaratta	11	24	90	Albury	8	8	56
3	1st semi	Myrtleford	9	10	64	Albury	8	9	57
4	2nd semi	Wangaratta	11	9	75	Lavington	5	11	41
5	Preliminary	Lavington	12	19	91	Myrtleford	11	4	70
6	Grand	Lavington	14	14	98	Wangaratta	9	10	64

2020 season: abandoned due to COVID-19. O&MFNL in recess.

=== 2014 season ===
- Senior Football
  - Premiers: Albury (defeated Yarrawonga 13.13.91 to 12.12.84)
  - Minor Premiers: Albury (Wins: 16, Draws: 1, Losses: 1)
  - Wooden Spoon: Wodonga (Wins: 1, Draws: 1, Losses: 16)
  - Morris Medal – Best & Fairest: 26 Votes – Kristan Height, Myrtleford
  - Strang Medal – Leading Goalkicker: 116 Goals – Setanta O'Hailpin, Albury
- A-Grade Netball
  - Premiers: Yarrawonga (defeated Wodonga 49 to 40)
  - Minor Premiers: Yarrawonga (Wins: 14, Draws: 1, Losses: 3)
  - Wooden Spoon: Wodonga Raiders (Wins: 0, Draws: 0, Losses: 18)
  - Toni Wilson Medal – Best & Fairest: 27 Votes – Jacqueline Newton, North Albury
  - Leading goalscorer: 701 Goals – Bridget Cassar, Yarrawonga

== O&MFL representative match results ==
Senior football

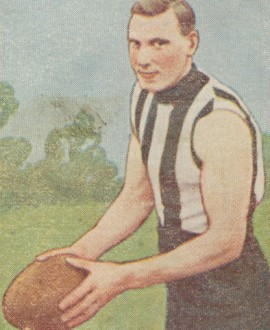
Percy Rowe, 1926 O&MFL captain

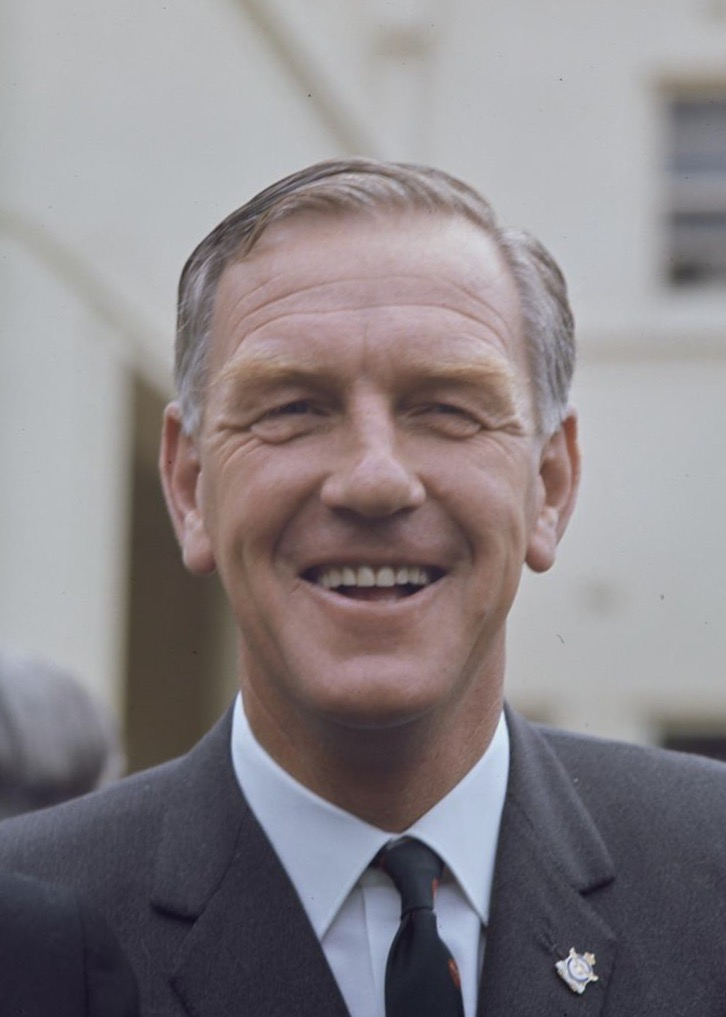
Mac Holten, 1953 O&MFL captain

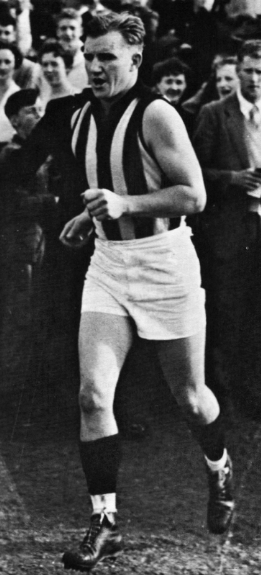
Bob Rose: 1957 O&MFL captain / coach

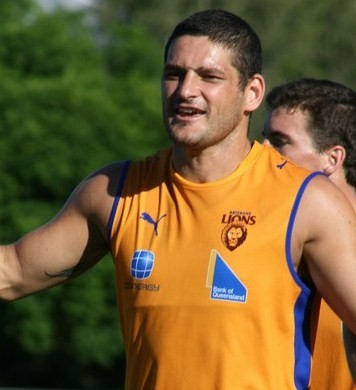
Brendan Fevola: 2014 and 2015 O&MFL coach

The first known representative match was in 1914 when a team from the Albury, Corowa and Howlong clubs (O&M – NSW) played against a team made of Lake Rovers, Mount Ophir and Rutherglen (O&M – Vic), with the Victorian side defeating NSW by two points on the Albury Sportsground, in the State of Origin match.

In 1958, the O&MFL picked two separate teams, with one playing the Farrer Football League and the other playing the Riverina Football League, with both games played on the weekend of 4 and 5 July 1958.

Caltex had the naming rights of the Victorian Country Championships matches in the 1960s. The 16 league series would run over a two-year period, with knock out matches in the first season, followed by semi finals and a grand final in the following season.

In 1974, the O&MFL were disaffiliated with the VCFL, when the O&MFL refused to accept an application from the Lavington Football Club to join the league and were not allowed to compete in the Victorian Country Championships in 1974. The VCFL Country Championships was put on hold from 1975 to 1977. The O&MFL were re-affiliated with VCFL in 1976.

In 1998, the VAFA defeated the O&MFL at Waverley Park to win the Smokefree Victorian Challenge match, as a curtain raiser to the AFL Ansett Cup Pre season grand final, then the O&MFL turned the tables on the VAFA the following year in the same challenge match at the same venue.

From 2004 to 2006 the championships were decided at a carnival round-robin competition at one venue over a single weekend, with each of the four sides playing the others in matches of two twenty-minute halves. The team on top of the ladder, after these three matches, were declared the winner. Leagues not represented in the top four pools of four participated in other inter-league matches organised by the VCFL.

In 2007, there was no statewide VCFL Championships, just a rivalry round was played between close by leagues, (with the O&MFL playing the GVFL), with the round robin format returning in 2008.

The O&M have gone onto win the first division of the Victorian Country Football League interleague championship fourteen times, the most recent victory being in 2009.

The O&MFL representative teams wears a gold guernsey, emblazoned with a monogram-style black "O&M" initials, with black shorts and black socks.

VCFL League rankings

In 2009 the VCFL decided to rank each country football league, with the O&MFL initially ranked number one.

The Metropolitan and Country Football Championships merged in 2016 to create a statewide competition, with the rankings reorganised to include metropolitan leagues in 2017.

The O&MFL were ranked number five in Victoria in the 2019 VCFL Country Championships.

As of 2020, AFL Victoria decided to scrap its traditional interleague competition, but leagues could decide amongst themselves, if they wish to play or not.

- 2009 – 1
- 2010 – 3
- 2011 – 5
- 2012 – 5
- 2013 – 3
- 2014 – 5
- 2015 – 4
- 2016 – 5
- 2017 – 6
- 2018 – 4
- 2019 – 5
- 2020 – AFL Victoria abandon the Victorian Country Football Championships. No interleague competition > COVID-19.

The Ash Wilson Trophy

The Ovens & Murray Football League and the Goulburn Valley Football League have played for this trophy since 2001, to honour two long serving players – GVFL's Stephen Ash and OMFL's Mick Wilson, but the league's have been competing against each other in inter league football matches since 1930, when they first met at the Wangaratta Showgrounds, with the OMFL winning 17 and the GVFL winning 10 matches.

VCFL Championships

- VCFL Championships – Division One:
  - 1954, 1955, 1957, 1967/68, 1985, 1987, 1996, 1997, 1998, 1999, 2001, 2006, 2008, 2009.
- Runners Up
  - 1956, 1965/66, 1970, 1980, 1982, 2009.
- Division Two Champions
  - 1994
- Highest Score by the O&MFL
  - 1971 – O&MFL: 30.15 – 195 v Farrer FL No.2 team: 12.8 – 80
- Lowest Score by the O&MFL
  - 1970 – Hampden FL: 9.19 – 73 d O&MFL: 3.12 – 30 (VCFL grand final in Warrnambool).
- Most O&M Rep games
  - 33: John Smith (Did the O&MFNL play 33 rep games during Smith's career span in the O&MFNL?).
  - 23: Mick Wilson (1990–2000)
- Most Goals in a match
  - 11 – Norm Minns: 1955 – O&M v Benalla Tungamah FL (VCFL semi final)
  - 11 – Adam Prior: 2014 – O&M v Hampden FL
  - 9 – Terry Bartel: 1971 – O&M v Farrer FL

Year	Captain	Coach	Venue	O&M score	Match result	O&M opposition	Match score	Comments
1914			Albury Sportsground	12.9 – 81 (Vic)	defeated	O&MFA – NSW	10.16 – 76	O&M Vic v O&M NSW
1922	R Williams		Wangaratta	8.6 – 54	lost to	Carlton	14.14 – 98	Gate: £114
1926	Percy Rowe		Albury Showground	13.13 – 91	lost to	Victorian FL	16.11 – 107	Gate: £185
1928	Harry Hunter		Wang Showgrounds	15.14 – 104	lost to	Victorian FL	16.15 – 111	Gate: £86
1930	Ernie Loveless		Wang Showgrounds	15.13 – 103	lost to	Goulburn Valley FL	16.14 – 110	
1933			Albury Showgrounds	8.18 – 66	defeated	Albury & DFL	8.15 – 63	12/8/33
1933			Albury Showground	21.16 – 142	lost to	Richmond FC	24.16 – 160	
1934	Frank Cleary		Tatura	11.10 – 76	defeated	Goulburn Valley FL	7.14 – 56	Gate: £16
1946			Albury Sportsground	4.7 – 35	lost to	Footscray FC	25.22 – 172	June'46
1946			Albury Sportsground	10.7 – 67	lost to	Richmond FC	29.18 – 192	
1949		Mac Holten		13.13 – 91	lost to	Footscray FC	15.9 – 99	4/9/49
1949	Bill King	Bill King	Corowa	18.10 – 118	lost to	Essendon FC	8.5 – 53	
1952	Mac Holten		Leeton Showgrounds	24.16 – 160	defeated	SWDFL	7.10 – 52	10/6/52
1952	Mac Holten		Trumper Park, Sydney	17.24 – 126	defeated	Sydney FL	7.15 – 57	14/6/52
1952			Corowa	11.12 – 78	lost to	Richmond	13.11 – 89	
1953	Mac Holten		Park Oval, Echuca	11.13 – 79	defeated	Bendigo FL	11.11 – 77	
1954	Marty McDonnell	Marty McDonnell	Ballarat	9.18 – 73	defeated	Goulburn Valley FL	5.7 – 37	
1954	Greg Tate	Marty McDonnell	Eastern Oval, Ballarat	11.11 – 77	defeated	Bendigo FL	8.21 – 69	VCFL Champions
1954	Marty McDonnell	Marty McDonnell	Albury Sportsground	8.9 – 57	lost to	East Perth FC	13.13 – 91	18/7/1954
1954		Mac Holten	Wangaratta Showgrounds	7.10 – 52	lost to	Melbourne FC	20.19 – 139	2/10/1954
1955	Tim Robb	Mac Holten	Wangaratta Cricket Ground	15.20 – 110	defeated	Murray FL	10.8 – 68	
1955	Tim Robb	Mac Holten	Albury Sportsground	29.20 – 194	defeated	Benalla Tungamah FL	13.12 – 90	Semi-final
1955	Tim Robb	Mac Holten	Albury Sportsground	14.18.102	defeated	Ballarat FL	10.13.73	G Final. VCFL Champions
1956	Doug Palmer	Doug Palmer	Bendigo	29.18 – 192	defeated	Sunraysia FL	14.12 – 96	
1956	Doug Palmer	Doug Palmer	QEO, Bendigo	8.6 – 54	lost to	Ballarat FL	9.13 – 67	Grand Final
1957	Bob Rose	Bob Rose	Albury	17.24 – 126	defeated	Sunraysia FL	15.14 – 104	
1957	Bob Rose	Bob Rose	Albury	14.21 – 105	defeated	Ballarat FL	10.16 – 76	VCFL Champions
1958	Bob Rose	Bob Rose	Leeton, NSW	21.11 – 137	defeated	Riverina FL	14.15 – 99	5/7/58
1958	Des Healey	Des Healey	Albury, NSW	23.25 – 163	defeated	Farrer FL	10.13 – 73	4/7/58
1959								No rep football
1960								No rep football ?
1961	Bob Rose	Bob Rose	Narrandera	13.21 – 99	defeated	Southern Riverina FL	10.13 – 73	Rd.1 10/6/61
1961	Bob Rose	Bob Rose	Wang Showgrounds	13.11 – 89	defeated	Goulburn Valley FL	8.8 – 56	Rd.2 12/6/61
1961			Corowa, NSW	10.15 – 75	lost to	Essendon	18.11 – 119	17/9/1961
1962		Bob Rose	Bendigo	9.12 – 66	lost to	Bendigo FL	12.8 – 80	Semi-final
1962			Corowa, NSW	13.13 – 91	lost to	Collingwood	19.21 – 136	
1963	Lionel Ryan	Bill Stephen	Albury, NSW	13.12.90	lost to	SWDFL	15.18.108	Rd.1. 8/6/63
1964								No games in 1964
1965	John Hoiles	John Hoiles	Shepparton	9.16 – 70	defeated	Goulburn Valley FL	8.5 – 53	Rd.1. 13/6/65
1965	John Hoiles	John Hoiles	Albury, NSW	13.11.89	defeated	SWDFL	9.11.65	Rd.2. 24/7/65
1966	Murray Weideman	Ken Boyd	Albury Sportsground	17.20 – 122	defeated	Bendigo FL	8.10 – 58	S Final. 11/6/66
1966	John Hoiles	Ken Boyd	Wang Showgrounds	12.16 – 88	lost to	Hampden FL	14.7 – 91	Grand Final. 7/7/66
1967	Murray Weideman	Murray Weideman	Wang Showgrounds	15.18 – 108	defeated	Warranga North East FL	7.6 – 48	Rd.1
1967	Murray Weideman	Murray Weideman	City Oval, Wangaratta	16.15 – 111	defeated	Goulburn Valley FL	10.12 – 72	Rd.2
1968	Mick Bone	Mick Bone	Yallourn	15.13 – 103	defeated	La Trobe FL	9.15 – 69	S Final.
1968	Mick Bone	Mick Bone	Horsham City Oval	15.13 – 103	defeated	Wimmera FL	10.8 – 68	VCFL Champions
1969	Mick Bone	Mick Bone	Albury Sportsground	19.22. – 136	defeated	SWDFL	10.14 – 74	13/7/69. Rd.1
1970	Mick Bone	Mick Bone	City Oval, Wangaratta	15.14 – 104	defeated	Bendigo FL	13.10 – 88	Semi-final
1970	Mick Bone	Mick Bone	Reid Oval, Warrnambool	3.12 – 30	lost to	Hampden FL	9.19 – 73	Grand Final
1971	Martin Cross	Martin Cross	Yerong Creek, NSW	30.15 – 195	defeated	Farrer FL	12.7 – 79	Rd.1
1971	Martin Cross	Martin Cross	Yerong Creek, NSW	18.14 – 122	defeated	Farrer FL No.2 team	12.8 – 80	No.2 teams
1971	Martin Cross	Martin Cross	Wangaratta Showgrounds	22.4 – 136	defeated	Goulburn Valley FL	8.10 – 58	Rd.2
1972	Neville Hogan	Neville Hogan	QE Oval, Bendigo	7.15 – 57	lost to	Bendigo FL	16.13 – 109	S Final. 10/6/72
1973	Neville Hogan	Neville Hogan	Yarrawonga	25.18.168	defeated	Murray FL	14.10.94	Rd.1
1973	Neville Hogan	Neville Hogan	Corowa, NSW	15.2.92	defeated	SWDFL	11.15.81	Rd.2. 22/7/73
1974		Neville Hogan	Benalla	9.8 – 62	lost to	North Melbourne	18.13 – 121	10.03.1974
1974							O&M due to play in VCFL S Final	O&M barred from VCFL,'74
1975			City Oval, Wangaratta	24.23 – 167	defeated	Victorian FA	17.9 – 111	
1976			Martin Park, Wodonga	7.9 – 51	lost to	North Melbourne	22.10 – 142	7/3/76
1976		Bill Sammon	Bunton Park, Nth Albury	17.14.116	lost to	Victorian FA	19.11 – 125	25/4/76
1977		Phil Nolan	Gaimain, NSW	15.19 – 109	defeated	SWDFL	13.14 – 92	15/5/77
1978		Neville Hogan	Martin Park, Wodonga	18.26 – 124	defeated	SWDFL	11.10 – 76	
1978		Neville Hogan	Benalla Showgrounds	15.8 – 98	lost to	Goulburn Valley FL	17.12 – 114	
1979		Peter Chisnall	Wodonga		lost to	North Melbourne	by 10 goals	11/3/79
1979		Peter Chisnall	Wang Showgrounds	12.19 – 91	defeated	Tungamah FL	6.9 – 45	Rd.1
1979		Peter Chisnall	Shepparton	12.14 – 86	defeated	Goulburn Valley FL	11.10 – 76	Zone Final
1979		Peter Chisnell	North Albury	11.17 – 83	lost to	LaTrobe Valley FL	16.14 – 110	Semi-final
1980	Daryl Smith	Daryl Smith		19.11 – 125	defeated	Goulburn Valley FL	14.9 – 93	
1980	Daryl Smith	Daryl Smith	Sale	15.13 – 103	lost to	LaTrobe Valley FL	19.17 – 131	Grand Final
1981	Col Travaskis	Col Travaskis		19.11 – 125	defeated	SWDFL	14.19.103	10/5/81
1981	Col Travaskis	Col Travaskis	Shepparton	14.19 – 103	defeated	Goulburn Valley FL	12.11 – 83	Zone Final
1981	Col Travaskis	Col Travaskis	Wang Showgrounds	12.23.95	lost to	Western Border FL	15.11 – 101	Semi final
1982	John Smith	Noel Long		14.29 – 113	defeated	Bendigo FL	12.19 – 91	
1982	John Smith	Noel Long		23.20 – 158	defeated	North Central FL	21.16 – 142	
1982	John Smith	Noel Long		8.20 – 68	lost to	Ballarat FL	13.18 – 96	Grand Final
1983			Deakin Reserve, Shepparton	10.12 – 72	lost to	Goulburn Valley FL	13.18 – 96	Rd.1
1983			Lavington, NSW	15.15 – 105	defeated	Bendigo FL	14.11 – 95	Rd.2
1984								O&M did not compete
1985	Rod Coelli	John Byrne	Narrandera, NSW	24.21 – 165	defeated	Riverina FL	8.6 – 54	Rd.1 19.5.85
1985	Rod Coelli	John Byrne	Donald, Vic	21.16 – 142	defeated	North Central FL	13.8 – 86	S Final 8/6/85
1985	Rod Coelli	John Byrne	Wangaratta	20.21 – 141	defeated	Ballarat FL	13.7 – 85	G Final VCFL Champions
1986	Denis Sandral	John Byrne	Albury	19.16 – 130	defeated	Diamond Valley	12.17 – 87	25/4/86
1986	Denis Sandral	John Byrne	Bendigo	14.17 – 101	lost to	Bendigo FL	20.15 – 135	Rd.1, 11/5/86
1987		John Byrne	Albury Sportsground	21.16 – 142	defeated	Goulburn Valley FL	12.15 – 87	Rd.1 10/5/87
1987		John Byrne	Traralgon	25.23 – 173	defeated	LaTrobe Valley FL	14.8 – 92	S Final 5/6/87
1987		John Byrne	Mildura	22.13 – 145	defeated	Sunraysia FL	11.15 – 81	G Final VCFL Champions
1988	Rod Coelli	John Byrne	Wang Showgrounds	14.7.91	lost to	Geelong FL	16.17 – 113	7/5/88
1989	Denis Sandral	John Byrne	Morwell	14.14 – 98	defeated	LaTrobe Valley FL	14.11 – 95	Rd.1. 7/5/89
1989	Denis Sandral	John Byrne	Lavington	7.12 – 54	lost to	Bendigo FL	10.10 – 70	S Final. 10/6/89
1990	Denis Sandral	Kevin Neale	Wang Showgrounds	19.13 – 127	defeated	Goulburn Valley FL	15.11 – 101	Rd.1. 6/5/90
1990	Denis Sandral	Kevin Neale	Lavington, NSW	14.14 – 90	lost to	Bendigo FL	17.6 – 108	S Final. 9/6/90
1991			Albury	16.22.118	defeated	LaTrobe Valley FL	16.10 – 106	
1992	Peter Tossol			13.7.85	defeated	Bendigo FL	10.11.71	
1992	Peter Tossol		Geelong	11.15 – 81	lost to	Geelong FL	17.17 – 119	
1993	Rob Walker	Ray Card		9.12 – 66	lost to	Goulburn Valley FL	21.12 – 138	
1994		Peter Tossol		17.9.111	defeated	Riddell FL	6.13.49	Relegated to Div 2 in '94
1994		Peter Tossol		15.14.104	defeated	Mornington Peninsula	10.9.69	
1994		Peter Tossol		12.8.80	defeated	North Central FL	9.15.69	Div 2: VCFL Champions
1995		Peter Tossol		11.10.76	defeated	Bendigo FL	9.14.68	
1995		Peter Tossol		5.6.36	lost to	Gippsland LaTrobe	9.9.63	
1996	Rob Walker	Peter Tossol		18.16.124	defeated	Hampden FL	10.12.72	
1996	Rob Walker	Peter Tossol		18.14.122	defeated	Mid Murray FL	15.18.108	
1996	Rob Walker	Peter Tossol	Martin Park, Wodonga	15.12 – 102	defeated	Geelong FL	14.10 – 94	VCFL Champions
1997	Craig Fruend	Bob Craig		17.20.122	defeated	Footscray & DFL	7.8 – 50	
1997	Craig Fruend	Bob Craig		19.16.130	defeated	Bendigo FL	19.7.121	
1997	Craig Fruend	Bob Craig	Geelong	8.18 – 66	defeated	Geelong FL	6.4 – 40	VCFL Champions
1998		Bob Craig	Waverley Park	11.12 – 78	lost to	Victorian Amateurs FL	12.9 – 81	
1998		Bob Craig		21.20 – 146	defeated	Central Murray FL	14.11 – 95	
1998		Bob Craig		12.13.85	defeated	Murray FL	7.12.54	June'98
1998		Bob Craig	Wodonga	14.13 – 97	defeated	Geelong FL	12.17 – 89	VCFL Champions
1999		Bob Craig	Waverley Park	9.9 – 63	defeated	Victorian Amateurs FL	8.7 – 55	
1999	Mick Wilson	Bob Craig	J C Lowe Oval, Yarrawonga	12.16 – 88	defeated	Murray FL	8.15 – 63	
1999	Mick Wilson	Bob Craig	Moe	10.16 – 76	defeated	Gippsland LaTrobe FL	11.9 – 75	VCFL Champions
2000		Bob Craig		9.10 – 64	defeated	Eastern FL	5.12.42	
2000	Mick Wilson	Bob Craig		15.9 – 99	lost to	Goulburn Valley FL	14.27 – 111	
2001		Paul Spargo		16.12.108	defeated	Murray FL	9.6.60	Rd.1
2001		Paul Spargo		22.16 – 148	defeated	Hampden FL	13.12 – 90	S Final
2001		Paul Spargo	Lavington Sportsground	22.18 – 150	defeated	Goulburn Valley FL	14.9 – 93	G Final. VCFL Champions
2002	Brad Thompson	Peter Seymour	Yarrawonga	17.18 – 120	defeated	West Gippsland LaTrobe FL	9.13.67	Rd.1
2002	Brad Thompson	Peter Seymour	Warrnambool	13.14.92	lost to	Hampden FL	14.12.96	Semi-final
2003	Tim Hargreaves	Mick Wilson	W J Findlay Oval, Wang	4.14 – 38	lost to	Goulburn Valley FL	8.5 – 53	wet day/low scores
2004		Mick Wilson	Shepparton	6.9 – 45	lost to	Goulburn Valley FL	9.4 – 58	2 x 20 min halves
2004		Mick Wilson	Shepparton		defeated	Mornington Peninsula FL		2 x 20 min halves
2004		Mick Wilson	Shepparton	2.5 – 17	lost to	Geelong FL	9.2 – 56	2 x 20 min halves
2005		Mick Wilson	Geelong	3.4 – 22	lost to	Goulburn Valley FL	11.8 – 74	2 x 20 min halves
2005		Mick Wilson	Geelong	7.2 – 44	lost to	Geelong FL	7.8 – 50	2 x 20 min halves
2005		Mick Wilson	Geelong	?	defeated	Ballarat FL	?	2 x 20 min halves
2006	Dale Carmody	Richard Bence	Lavington, NSW	?	defeated	West Gippsland FL	by 28 points	2 x 20 min halves
2006	Dale Carmody	Richard Bence	Lavington, NSW	11.5 – 71	defeated	Goulburn Valley FL	2.4 – 16	2 x 20 min halves
2006	Dale Carmody	Richard Bence	Lavington, NSW	8.11 – 59	defeated	Ballarat FL	7.8 – 50	VCFL Champions
2007	Tim Hargreaves	Richard Bence	Wang Showgrounds	12.10 – 82	defeated	Goulburn Valley FL	12.7 – 79	No VCFL Championships in '07
2008		Corey Lambert	Deakin Reserve, Shepparton	10.2 – 62	defeated	Hampden FL	3.4 – 22	30/05/08
2008		Corey Lambert	Deakin Reserve, Shepparton	6.5 – 41	lost to	Goulburn Valley FL	6.6 – 42	31/05/08
2008		Corey Lambert	Deakin Reserve, Shepparton	6.10 – 46	defeated	Ballarat FL	6.4 – 40	1/6/08. VCFL Champions
2009		Robbie Jackson	Deakin Reserve, Shepparton	20.7 – 127	defeated	Goulburn Valley FL	12.8 – 80	VCFL Champions
2010		Robbie Jackson	Lavington Sportsground	9.10 – 64	lost to	Goulburn Valley FL	12.16 – 88	
2011		Matt Pendergast	Frankston Park	13.13 – 91	lost to	Mornington Peninsula FL	13.15 – 93	
2012		Matt Pendergast	Princes Park, Carlton	18.6 – 114	defeated	Hampden FL	10.6 – 66	
2013	Craig Ednie	Matt Pendergast	Princes Park, Carlton	7.13 – 55	lost to	Peninsula FL	15.10 – 100	
2014	Craig Ednie	Brendan Fevola	Wang Showgrounds	29.16 – 190	defeated	Hampden FL	10.5 – 65	
2015	Craig Ednie	Brendan Fevola	Albury Sportsground	10.10 – 70	lost to	Peninsula FL	11.14 – 80	
2016		Jon Henry &	Reid Oval, Warrnambool	20.14 – 134	defeated	Hampden FL	9.14 – 68	
		Darren Spencer						
2017		Jon Henry &	Martin Park, Wodonga	12.14 – 86	defeated	Goulburn Valley FL	11.13 – 79	
		Darren Spencer						
2018		Jon Henry &	J C Lowe Oval, Yarrawonga	21.14 – 140	defeated	Western Region F L	9.10 – 64	
		Brad Murray						
2019		Jon Henry &	Olympic Park, Rosebud	10.11 – 71	lost to	Mornington Peninsula Nepean FL	16.16 – 112	
		Brad Murray						
2020	O&M in recess	Damian Sexton	Albury			O&M were to play Hampden FL		No rep football>COVID-19
2021		Damian Sexton				O&M were to play GVFNL		No rep football>COVID-19
2022		Damian Sexton	Mooroopna Main Oval	18.11 – 119	defeated	Goulburn Valley FL	9.10 – 64	
2023	Leigh Williams	Damian Sexton	Albury Sports Ground	13.14 – 92	defeated	Goulburn Valley FL	13.7 – 85	
2024	Charlie Morrison	Damian Sexton	Deakin Reserve	7.6 – 48	lost	Goulburn Valley FL	8.15 – 63	25/5/24
2025	Cody Schutt	Jake Sharp	WJ Findlay Oval, Wang	18.19 – 127	defeated	Goulburn Valley FL	7.8 – 50	24/5/25
2026	Will Christie	Jake Sharp	QEO, Bendigo	11.11 – 77	lost to	Bendigo FNL	14.13 – 97	23/5/26
Year	Captain	Coach	Venue	O&M Score	Match Result	O&M Opposition	Match Score	Comments

The Norm Minns Medal

Norm Minns (08/01/1925-29/12/1987) was a former Wangaratta and O&MFL player and captain / coach of Benalla and Corowa. He was also a long time O&MFL selector and life member.

The Norm Minns Medal is awarded to the O&MFL best player in senior representative football and was first awarded in 1997.

- 1997 – Guy Rigoni – Myrtleford
- 1998 – Brett Kirk – North Albury
- 1999 – Tim Hargreaves – Yarrawonga
- 1999 – Travis McLean – Albury
- 2000 – Tim Hargreaves – Yarrawonga
- 2001 – Rod Skender – Myrtleford
- 2002 – Travis Hodgson – North Albury
- 2003 – Kade Stevens – Lavington
- 2004 – Jarrod Twitt – Wodonga
- 2005 – Peter Taylor – Wangaratta Rovers
- 2006 – Craig Ednie – Yarrawonga
- 2007 – Scott Oswald – Yarrawonga
- 2008 – Matt Prendergast – Lavington
- 2009 – David Clarke – Corowa Rutherglen
- 2010 – Matt Pendergast – Lavington
- 2011 – Michael Stevens – Yarrawonga
- 2012 – Judd Porter – Wangaratta
- 2013 – Jarrod Thompson – Yarrawonga
- 2014 – Joel Mackie – North Albury
- 2015 – Sam Carpenter – Corowa Rutherglen
- 2016 – Daniel Cross – Albury
- 2017 – Jono Spina – Lavington
- 2018 – Mark Whiley – Yarrawonga
- 2019 – Nathan Cooper – Wangaratta Rovers
- 2020 – O&MFL in recess. COVID-19
- 2021 – No rep football
- 2022 – Issac Muller – Wodonga Raiders
- 2023 – Jim Grills – Albury
- 2024 – Perry Lewis Smith – Yarrawonga
- 2025 – Noah Bradshaw – Wodonga
- 2026 – Charlie Morrison – Wodonga

The Peter Johnston Medal

Peter Johnston was a former North Albury FC and O&MFNL official and life member of both organisations.

This medal is awarded to the best Under 18 O&MFNL footballer in representative matches.

- 2017 – Bailey Frauenfalder: Yarrawonga
- 2018 – Will Quirk: Myrtleford
- 2019 – Jake Bradshaw:
- 2020 – No interleague football > COVID-19
- 2021 – No interleague football > COVID-19
- 2022 – Josh Mathey – Wodonga
- 2023 –
- 2024 – Max Bihun – Wangaratta
- 2025 – Isaiah Robertson – Lavington

== Ovens & Murray Hall of Fame ==
The Ovens & Murray Hall of Fame was established in 2005, to recognise and promote the outstanding achievements of some of the league's greatest players, dedicated administrators and club support staff and long serving media representatives.

As of the 2022 ceremony there have been 87 inductees, including three netballers.

Only seven people have received the additional honour of being promoted to "Legend" status.

- 2005 – Cleaver Bunton AO OBE
- 2007 – Rob Walker
- 2012 – Neville Hogan
- 2013 – Jim Sandral
- 2017 – Stan Sargeant
- 2022 – Martin Cross
- 2023 – John Smith
- 2025 – Steve Norman

== Netball ==
History

The netball competition's were added to the Ovens & Murray Football League from the 1993 season, with A and B. Grade. The C. Grade competition was established in 1996, with the 17 and under competition commencing in 2012.

The Toni Wilson Medal is awarded for the best and fairest A-Grade netball player in the OMFNL during the home and away season. Wilson (the older sister of Mick Nolan) was the first President of the O&M Netball Association and instrumental in getting the netball competition formed in 1993.

== Minor grades ==
=== Junior development ===
More successful has been the Murray Bushrangers TAC Cup Under 18s side, who play their home games in Wangaratta; prior to the AFL national draft and the inception of the TAC Cup, young players in the area would usually play through the grades with their local club, with less likelihood of being scouted by the recruitment staff from AFL clubs. Although there has been some concern from clubs about these players being removed from the local competition, the ones that do not get drafted usually return to their home clubs to play locally once they come of age.

Even in that case, there is some chance that a late-maturing "older" player in their early 20s will be drafted by an AFL club. Several notable examples to be drafted directly from the O&MFL include, Guy Rigoni (Myrtleford/Melbourne), Brett Kirk (North Albury/Sydney Swans) and Karl Norman.

All clubs field sides in the under 18s competition, aside from Myrtleford, which fields a joint team with the "Bright Football Club" wearing navy blue and gold colours & the club will be known as the "Alpine Eagles", and they would also field an under 18s joint team in the "Ovens & King Football League" also wearing navy blue and gold colours & the club will be known as the Alpine Eagles. However the Alpine Eagles alliance between Myrtleford and Bright had strained over the last few seasons before finally after the 2013 season The Myrtleford under-18s announced that they will stop wearing navy blue and gold colours of the "Alpine Eagles" and will be returning to the red, white and black colours & the club will be known as the "Myrtleford Saints", ending their almost 10-year partnership with Bright, in place since the early 2000s.

=== Albury Wodonga Junior Football League ===
Albury Wodonga Junior Football League League Website
Club	Moniker	Home ground(s)	Under 16 Elwyn Langford Cup	Under 14 Bill Schultz Cup	Under/12 Toon Family Cup
Albury Juniors Club Website	Tigers	Albury Sports Ground (Albury)	Yes	Yes / Yes	Yes
Corowa-Rutherglen Juniors Club Website	Roos	John Foord Oval (Corowa)	Yes	Yes / No	Yes
Lavington Juniors Club Website	Panthers	Lavington Sports Ground (Lavington)	Yes	No / Yes	Yes
North Albury Juniors Club Website	Hoppers	Bunton Park (North Albury)	Yes	No / Yes	Yes
Scots School Juniors FC Club Website	Scots	Scots School Oval (Albury)	Yes	No / Yes	No
St Patricks Juniors FC Club Website	Saints	Xavier High School Oval (Albury)	Yes	Yes / No	Yes
Wodonga Juniors Club Website	Bulldogs	John Flower Oval (Wodonga)	Yes	Yes / Yes	Yes
Wodonga Raiders Juniors Club Website	Raiders	Birallee Park (Wodonga)	Yes	Yes / Yes	Yes
Yarrawonga Juniors Club Website	Pigeons	J.C. Lowe Oval (Yarrawonga)	Yes	Yes / No	Yes

Notes: Team field by club for that age group; " Yes =Yes" & " No =No".

=== Wangaratta & District Junior Football League ===
- Wangaratta & District Junior Football League

The W&DJFL was established in 1938 and currently has three divisions of football in the Under 12's, Under 14's and Under 17's. All the Wangaratta-based club's in the Wangaratta & District Junior Football League club's are independent incorporated local community sports club's and are not affiliated with any O&MFNL or O&KFNL clubs.

2026 W&DJFL Clubs

- Centrals: U/12, U/14, U/17 (3 teams)
- College: U/12, U/14, U/17 (3)
- Imperials: U/12, U/14, U/17 (3)
- Junior Magpies: U/12, U/14, U/17 (3)
- Kangaroos: U/12, U/14, U/17 (3)
- Tigers: U/12, U/14, U/17 (3)
- Benalla: U/12 - Black, U/12 - Red, U/14 - Black, U/14 - Red, U/17 (5)
- Bright: U/12, U/14, U/17 (3)
- Mansfield: U/12, U/14, U/17 (3)
- Myrtleford: U/12, U/14, U/17 (3)

Some of the former W&DJFL players that went onto play VFL / AFL senior football were – John Brady, Lance Oswald, Ian Rowland, Sam Kekovich, Mick Nolan, Mark Browning, Dennis Carroll, Darren Steele, Chris Naish, Steve Johnson, Alipate Carlile, Ben Reid, Sam Reid, Jack Crisp, Dominic Bedendo, Joe Richards and Darcy Wilson

=== AFLNEB Youth Girls League ===
- AFL North East Border Female Football League

== O&MFNL Players / Stawell Gift winners ==
The following O&MFNL footballers / netballers have won the prestigious Stawell Gift. The year below indicates what year each O&MFNL player won their Stawell Gift.

- 1908 – Chris King – Rutherglen Football Club (1893)
- 1928 – Lynch Cooper – Wangaratta Football Club
- 1929 – Clarrie Hearn – Rutherglen Football Club (1893)
- 1932 – Roy L. Barker – Yarrawonga Football Club
- 1934 – Tom L. Roberts – Yarrawonga Football Club
- 1952 – Lance Mann – Albury Football Club
- 1954 – Jack Hayes – Rutherglen Football Club (1893)
- 1966 & 1967 - Bill Howard - Albury Football Club
- 1986 – Glen Chapman – Albury Football Club
- 2023 – Bella Pasquali – Wangaratta Rovers Football Club (Women's gift)

Stawell Gift – Hall of Fame Inductees

- Jack King – Rutherglen Football Club (1893)
- Greg O'Keeffe – Wangaratta Rovers Football Club. Father of Sean O'Keeffe.

== See also ==
- Ovens and Murray
- Group 9 Rugby League
- Murray Cup
- AFL Victoria Country: Victorian Country Championships

Year by year team photos
- 1923 – Corowa FC team photo
- 1923 – O&MFL Premiers: St. Patrick's FC team photo
- 1926 – O&MFL Grand Final photos. St. Patrick's FC & Wangaratta FC
- 1928 – O&MFL Premiers: Albury FC team photo
- 1928 – O&MFL Runners Up: St. Patrick's FC
- 1929 – East Albury FC team photo
- 1929 – East Albury FC team photo
- 1931 – O&MFL Premiers: Weir United FC team photo
- 1932 – Corowa FC & East Albury FC team photos
- 1934 – Corowa FC & Albury FC team photos
- 1937 – Corowa FC & Wangaratta FC team photos
- 1939 – O&MFL Premiers – Albury FC – team photo
- 1944 – Border United FC & Rutherglen FC team photos
- 1947 – Border United FC team photo
- 1950 – Corowa FC team photo
- 1953 – Corowa FC team photo
- 1963 – O&MFL Runners Up: Corowa FC team photo
- 1926 – Wangaratta FC & St. Patrick's FC team photos (June, 1926)
- 1926 – Ovens & Murray FL Grand Final team photos: Wangaratta FC & St. Patrick's FC (September, 1926)
- 1929 – Wangaratta FC team photo
- 1930 – Wangaratta FC & East Albury FC team photos
- 1933 – Wangaratta FC & Border United FC team photo
- 1934 – Wangaratta FC & Rutherglen FC team photos
- 1937 – Wangaratta FC & Corowa FC team photos
- 1938 – Ovens & Murray FL Grand Final team photos: Wangaratta FC & Yarrawonga FC
- 1969 – O&MFL Grand Final Critic
