= Leongatha Football Club =

Leongatha

Names
- Full name: Leongatha Football Netball Club
- Nickname: Parrots

Club details
- Founded: 1894; 132 years ago
- Colours
- Competition: Gippsland League
- President: Mal Mackie
- Coach: Trent McMicking
- Captain: Tom Marriott
- Premierships: (28) 1894 (GSFA), 1905 (WFA), 1923 (KDFA), 1924, 1931, 1932, 1934 (SGFA) 1935, 1940, 1951, CGFA) 1954, 1955, 1960, 1961, 1963, 1964 (SGFL), 1970, 1977, 1979, 1982, 1989 (LVFL), 1995, 1997 (GLFL), 2001 (WGFL), 2017, 2018, 2022, 2023 (GFL)
- Ground: Leongatha Recreation Reserve

Uniforms
Home

Other information
- Official website: leongathafc.net

The Leongatha Football Club, nicknamed the Parrots, is an Australian rules football and netball club based in the town of Leongatha, Victoria. The club teams currently compete in the Gippsland League.

== Club history ==
Leongatha Football Club

Founded in 1894, the club has participated in various Gippsland football leagues, and won 26 senior football premierships.

In 1903 the club was reformed with George F. Michael as President.

In 1910, Leongatha Junior FC (11.12 - 78) won the premiership, defeating Outtrim Junior FC (4.3 - 27).

In 1911, Leongatha FC joined the Leongatha and District Football Association, along with the South Leongatha FC.

In 1913, Leongatha finish second on the ladder with seven wins and their second semi final against Korumburra had to be played twice, after the first game was drawn. Korumburra won the replay by one goal.

In 1915, the club colours were a blue guernsey, red sash with red and black stockings. In July, 1915, the club's committee instructed club delegate's to terminate the football season due to the fact that eight Leongatha footballers are already at the front and seven more have enlisted in the Army. Leongatha FC continued on and played out the season.

Leongatha Juniors (1.4 - 10) were defeated in the 1922 grand final against Ruby (3.4 - 22).

In 1924, Footscray, VFA premiers, visited Leongatha in October and played a game that was marred by heavy rain squalls throughout the day. Leongatha (6.7 - 43) got up against Footscray (4.14 - 38) in a low scoring game.

In 1934, Leongatha FC boasted 1200 members on their books!

In 1948, Leongatha Second 18 commenced playing in the Central Gippsland Football League's Reserves competition.

In 1954, Leongatha FC entered two teams in the South Gippsland Football League, Leongatha Green and Leongatha Gold, with Leongatha Green winning the 1954 premiership!

Leongatha Imperials Football Club

In 1929, the Leongatha Imperials Football Club was formed and initially played in the Bass Valley Football Association. Leongatha Imperials were runner-up to Poowong in the 1929 grand final.

In 1931 Leongatha Imperials moved across to the Woorayl Football Association. In 1934, the town of Leongatha boasted three football teams, with a team called Nerrena / South Leongatha entering the Woorayl FA in 1934 and 1935, with the "senior" team playing in the Central Gippsland FA.

The “Imperials” won the 1934 Woorayl FA premiership defeating Mt. Eccles in the Grand Final.

In 1936, Imperials joined the Korumburra Lang Lang Football Association and lost the grand final to Lang Lang by three points.

In March, 1937, the Leongatha FC & the Leongatha Imperials FC decided to run both clubs under the one Leongatha FC committee. Leongatha Imperials Football Club won the 1937 Korumburra Football Association premiership, when they defeated Nyora in the grand final.

== Football Competitions Timeline ==
Leongatha Football Club

- 1894 to 1896 - Great Southern Football Association
- 1897 to 1902 - Club appeared to be in recess.
- 1903 & 1904 - Great Southern Football Association
- 1905 - Woorayl Football Association
- 1906 to 1910 - Korumburra District Football Association
- 1911 - Leongatha withdraws from Korumburra DFA & joins the Leongatha & District Football Association.
- 1912 to 1914 - Korumburra District Football Association
- 1915 - Korumburra District Line Football Association.
- 1916 to 1918 - Club in recess, due to World War I
- 1919 to 1923 Korumburra District Football Association
- 1924 to 1932 - Southern Gippsland Football Association
- 1933 - Club in recess. Could not find a league to enter after the SGFA folded. Leongatha Imperials FC entered a team in the Central Gippsland Football Association in 1933.
- 1934 to 1940 - Central Gippsland Football Association
- 1940 to 1945 - Club in recess due to World War II
- 1946 to 1953 - Central Gippsland Football League
- 1954 to 1968 - South Gippsland Football League
- 1969 to 1994 - LaTrobe Valley Football League
- 1995 to 2001 - Gippsland LaTrobe Football League
- 2002 to 2004 - West Gippsland LaTrobe Football League
- 2005 to 2021 - Gippsland Football League

Leongatha Imperials Football Club

- 1929 & 1930 - Bass Valley Football Association
- 1931 to 1935 - Woorayl Football Association
- 1936 to 1941 - Korumburra Lang Lang Football Association

== Football Premierships ==
Leongatha Football Club
Seniors (26)

- Great Southern Football Association
  - 1894 (undefeated - no grand final)
- Woorayl Football Association
  - 1905 (undefeated - no grand final)
- Koorumburra District Football Association
  - 1923 - Leongatha: 10.12 - 72 defeated Korumburra: 2.5 - 17
- Southern Gippsland Football Association
  - 1924 - Leongatha: 5.5 - 35 defeated Korumburra: 2.6 - 18
- South Gippsland Football Association
  - 1931 - Leongatha: 14.8 - 92 defeated Wonthaggi Town: 5.10 - 40
  - 1932 - Leongatha: 18.23 - 119 defeated Mirboo North: 11.5 - 71 (undefeated premiers)
  - 1934 - Leongatha: 15.14 - 104 defeated Moe: 15.13 - 103
- Central Gippsland Football Association
  - 1935 - Leongatha: 19.18 - 132 defeated Mirboo North: 7.5 - 47,
  - 1940 - Leongatha: 14.12 - 96 defeated Morwell: 11.6 - 72
  - 1951 - Leongatha: 13.18 - 96 defeated Yallourn: 13.8 - 86
- South Gippsland Football League
  - 1954 - Leongatha Greens: 8.14 - 62 defeated Korumburra Rovers 6.11 - 47
  - 1955 - Leongatha: defeated Korumburra:
  - 1960 - Leongatha: 11.12 - 78 defeated Stony Creek: 10.9 - 69
  - 1961 - Leongatha: 10.12 - 72 defeated Wonthaggi: 6.10 - 46
  - 1963 - Leongatha: 8.8 - 56 defeated Korumburra: 7.6 - 48
  - 1964 - Leongatha: 7.7 - 49 defeated Mirboo North 6.7 - 43
- LaTrobe Valley Football League
  - 1970 - Leongatha: defeated Moe:
  - 1977 - Leongatha: 13.14 - 92 defeated Traralgon: 11.11 - 77
  - 1979 - Leongatha: 21.23 - 149 defeated Traralgon: 10.12 - 72
  - 1982 - Leongatha: defeated ?
  - 1989 - Leongatha: 12.7 - 79 defeated Maffra: 11.11 - 77
- Gippsland Latrobe Football League
  - 1995 - Leongatha: 23.24 - 162 defeated ?
  - 1997 - Leongatha: defeated Morwell:
- West Gippsland Latrobe Football League
  - 2001 - Leongatha: defeated ?
- Gippsland Football League
  - 2017 - Leongatha: 15.10 - 100 defeated Maffra: 15.9 - 99
  - 2018 - Leongatha: 10.13 - 73 defeated Maffra: 10.4 - 64
  - 2022 - Leongatha: 10.10 - 70 defeated Sale: 6.12 - 48 Premiers & Champions
  - 2023 - Leongatha: 14.5 - 89 defeated Wonthaggi: 7.7 - 49

Leongatha Imperials Football Club
Seniors (4)

- Woorayl Football Association
  - 1931 - Leongatha Imperials: 10.7 - 67 defeated Mt. Eccles: 6.14 - 50
  - 1932 - Leongatha Imperials: 12.14 - 86 defeated Mardan: 9.8 - 62
  - 1935 - Leongatha Imperials: 15.13 - 103 defeated Mt. Eccles: 10.7 - 67
- Korumburra Lang Lang Football Association
  - 1937 - Leongatha Imperials: 9.8 - 62 defeated Nyora: 7.9 - 51

== Senior Football: Runner-Up ==
Leongatha Football Club
Seniors

- Wooryl Football Association
  - 1904 - Mt. Eccles: defeated Leongatha: by 17 points.
- South Gippsland Football League
  - Leongatha were runner-up four times in the SGFL. Years ?
- LaTrobe Valley Football League
  - 1980 - Traralgon: 19.16 - 130 defeated Leongatha: 12.12 - 84
  - 1994 - Traralgon: defeated Leongatha:
- Gippsland LaTrobe Football League
  - 1997 - Morwell: defeated Leongatha:
  - 1998 - Traralgon: 18.24 - 132 defeated Leongatha: 5.4 - 34
- Gippsland Football League
  - 2004 - Maffra: defeated Leongatha:
  - 2015 - Traralgon: 12.11 - 83 defeated Leongatha: 7.11 - 53
  - 2016 - Maffra: 13.10 - 88 defeated Leongatha: 9.13 - 67
  - 2019 - Maffra: 10.10 - 70 defeated Leongatha: 9.8 - 62

Leongatha Imperials Football Club

- Bass Valley Football Association
  - 1929 - Poowong: 3.9 - 27 defeated Leongatha Imperials: 3.6 - 21
- Korumburra Lang Lang Football Association
  - 1936 - Lang Lang: 9.9 - 63 defeated Leongatha Imperials: 9.6 - 60

== Notable players ==
The following list notes VFL/AFL footballers who played with the Leongatha FC prior to their VFL / AFL debut or were drafted to an AFL club.

- 1913 - Johnny Hassett - Melbourne
- 1925 - Martin Larkin - Footscray & Hawthorn
- 1926 - Jack Nolan - North Melbourne
- 1934 - Tom Bawden - Essendon
- 1938 - Bob Standfield - Essendon & Carlton
- 1939 - Mick Keighery - Fitzroy
- 1939 - Bob Bawden - Richmond
- 1939 - Alan McDonald - Richmond
- 1942 - Jim McDonald - Melbourne
- 1949 - Frank Bateman - Carlton
- 1959 - Ron Kee - St. Kilda
- 1970 - Ian Salmon - Essendon
- 1971 - Laurie Moloney - Essendon
- 1972 - Garry Baker - Footscray
- 1973 - Ivan Rasmussen - Footscray
- 1983 - Stephen Wallis - Footscray
- 1988 - Stuart Wigney - Footscray, Sydney, Adelaide & Richmond
- 1989 - Sasha Dyson-Holland - Fitzroy. No senior AFL games. 1989 Draft No. 45
- 1991 - Michael Johnston - Hawthorn & Footscray
- 1999 - Christin Macri - Footscray
- 2000 - Damien Adkins - Collingwood & West Coast Eagles
- 2005 - Jarryd Roughead - Hawthorn
- 2011 - Dyson Heppell - Essendon
- 2020 - Zach Reid - Essendon. 2020 Draft No. 10

The following footballers played senior VFL / AFL football prior to playing / coaching at Leongatha FC. The year indicates the player's first season at Leongatha FC.

- - 1931: Reg Baker - Collingwood & Richmond
- - 1947: Murray Exelby - Essendon
- - 1970: Terry Benton - North Melbourne
- - 1972: Max Parker - Footscray
- - 1980: Colin Boyd - Footscray & Essendon
- - 1994: Brian Royal - Footscray
- - 2003: Andrew Dunkley - Sydney Swans
- - 2003: Paul Hudson - Hawthorn
