= Wodonga Saints Football Club =

Australian rules football club

Wodonga Saints

Names
- Full name: Wodonga Saints Football Netball Club
- Nickname: Saints
- Motto: "Our Strength is within"
- Club song: "Oh When The Saints Go Marching In"

Club details
- Founded: 1907; 119 years ago
- Colours
- Competition: Tallangatta & District Football League
- Premierships: 1913, 1929
- Ground: Martin Park, Wodonga & Bethanga Park

Uniforms
Home

Other information
- Official website: wodongasaints.com.au

The Wodonga Saints Football Netball Club is an Australian rules football and netball club playing their home games at Martin Park in Wodonga, Victoria, Australia.

Originally established as the Bethanga Football Club in 1907, with the club was based at the Bethanga Park Recreation Reserve, Bethanga, Victoria, Australia up until 2001.

Following the 1999 Victorian Country Football League report that stated a number of clubs, including Bethanga, were on the verge of collapsing if some kind of action was not taken. After playing a handful of matches at Wodonga's Martin Park to see if there would be enough local support to support the club moving there, the club made the decision in 2002 and Bethanga FC relocated fully to Martin Park, Wodonga & were renamed as the Wodonga Saints Football Club.

== History ==
=== Bethanga Football Club ===
The Bethanga Football Club was established in 1907 and initially played in the Mitta Mitta Football League (Tallangatta Football Association) with its first match against Tallangatta Football Club at home at Bethanga Park in the black and red (Essendon) colors.

In June 1926, Bethanga Footballer, John Thomas Tankard received a knock to the stomach, resulting in severe pain, was later operated on at a private hospital, but later died.

Local brothers, Arthur Mills and Albert Mills played for Bethanga in the 1926 and 1927 Kiewa & District Football Association grand finals, before the family moved to Oxley, near Wangaratta, playing with Wangaratta Football Club in 1929, then both brothers made their debuts for the Hawthorn Football Club in 1930.

In 1928, Bethanga FC wore the colours of red, white and blue.

In 1958, Granya FC (who folded in 1954) and Bethanga FC merged to become the Granya / Bethanga Bombers and were coached by Norm Benstead, who happened to kick 100 plus goals in 1958. In 1959, the merged club changed its name to the Murray United Football Club and was coached by Alf Deane. Unfortunately for the local community the new club folded after the 1959 season, after winning only one game and forfeiting two. Granya FC would never reform and the Bethanga FC would not reform until the 1976 Tallangatta & District Football League season.

Football Competitions Timeline

Bethanga Football Club have played in the following football competitions.

- 1907 & 1908: Tallangatta Football Association
- 1909: Twomey Stewart Football Association
- 1910 to 1912: Club in recess.
- 1913: Mitta Mitta Valley Football League
- 1914: Wodonga & District Football Association
- 1915 to 1919: Club in recess due to World War I
- 1920 to 1921: Kiewa Football Association
- 1922 to 1923: Tallangatta & District Football Association
- 1924 to 1928: Kiewa & District Football Association
- 1928: Yackandandah & District Football Association - B. Grade competition
- 1929 to 1932: Yackandandah Football Association
- 1933: Tallangatta & District Football League
- 1934 to 1938: Hume Football League
- 1939: Dederang & District Football League
- 1940: Kiewa & Mitta Football League
- 1941 to 1944: Club in recess, due to World War II
- 1945 to 1947: Tallangatta & District Football League
- 1948: Club in recess
- 1949 to 1950: Tallangatta & District Football League
- 1951: Club in recess
- 1952 - 1955: Tallangatta & District Football League
- 1956: Chiltern & District Football Association
- 1957: Tallangatta & District Football League
- 1958: Granya / Bethanga Bombers FC - Tallangatta & District Football League
- 1959: Murray United Football Club - Tallangatta & District Football League
- 1960 to 1975: Club in recess
- 1976 to 2001: Bethanga FNC - Tallangatta & District Football League
- 2002 to 2026: Wodonga Saints FNC - Tallangatta & District Football League

Senior Football - Premierships

- Mitta Mitta Valley Football League
  - 1913: Bethanga defeated Granya by one point. Granya claimed that this match was a draw and refused to hand over the premiership trophy. Bethanga were compelled to take legal action against Granya Football Club to obtain possession of the premiership trophy. The case was to be heard at the Bethanga Police Court on the Wednesday 8 October 1913. This premiership trophy is now on display at the Bethanga Hotel.
- Yackandandah Football Association
  - 1929 - Bethanga: 5.15 - 45 defeated Yackandandah: 4.7 - 31

Senior Football - Runners Up

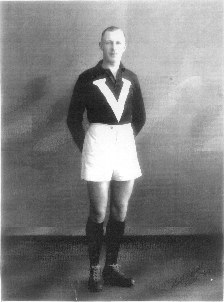
Bert Mills

- Tallangatta & District Football Association
  - 1922 - Tallangatta:9.8 - 62 defeated Bethanga: 3.5 - 23
- Kiewa & District Football Association
  - 1926 - Bethanga: 7.11 - 53 defeated Granya: 5.10 - 40. Bethanga won the first grand final, but Granya as minor premiers had the right to challenge Bethanga to a "Challenge Grand Final".
  - 1926 - Granya: 4.18 - 42 defeated Bethanga: 5.8 - 38 Granya won the 1926 premiership.
  - 1927 - Granya: 8.12 - 60 defeated Bethanga: 3.1 - 19
- Yackandandah Football Association
  - 1930 - Kergunyah: 11.6 - 72 defeated Bethanga: 6.16 - 52
  - 1931 - Talgarno: 8.6 - 54 drew with Bethanga: 8.6 - 54. Drawn grand final.
  - 1931 - Talgarno: 11.14 - 80 defeated Bethanga: 10.8 - 68. Grand final replay.
- Hume Football League
  - 1938 - Lavington: 17.23 - 125 defeated Bethanga: 5.6 - 36
- Tallangatta & District Football League
  - 1991 - Holbrook: 16.12 - 108 defeated Bethanga: 14.11 - 95

Bethanga FC footballers who played senior VFL football.

- 1927 - Clarrie Morelli - Collingwood
- 1930 - Arthur Mills - Hawthorn
- 1930 - Bert Mills - Hawthorn
- 1958 - Len Cottrell - Carlton

=== Wodonga Saints Football Netball Club ===
In 2002, the club decided to relocate to Martin Park, Wodonga in order to save the club from possibly folding.

- 2002–present: Tallangatta & District Football League

| Football Season | Senior Ladder Position | Reserves Ladder Position | Thirds / U/17's Ladder Position | Fourths / U/14's Ladder Position |
|---|---|---|---|---|
| 2002 | | | 5 | |
| 2003 | | | | |
| 2004 | | | | |
| 2005 | | | | |
| 2006 | | | | |
| 2007 | | | | |
| 2008 | | | | |
| 2009 | 11 | 10 | 1st | 12 |
| 2010 | 12 | 12 | 10 | 11 |
| 2011 | 12 | 9 | 7 | 7 |
| 2012 | 12 | 9 | 12 | 11 |
| 2013 | 10 | 9 | 12 | 12 |
| 2014 | 9 | 10 | 12 | 10 |
| 2015 | 12 | 12 | 12 | 12 |
| 2016 | 12 | 10 | 12 | 12 |
| 2017 | 11 | 11 | 12 | 12 |
| 2018 | 12 | 9 | 12 | 11 |
| 2019 | 11 | 7 | 12 | 11 |
| 2020 | COVID-19 | COVID-19 | COVID-19 | COVID-19 |
| 2021 | 12 | 9 | No team | No team |
| 2022 | 11 | 10 | No team | No team |
| 2023 | 10 | 10 | No team | No team |
| 2024 | 10 | 6 | No team | 2nd |
| 2025 | 10 | 10 | 6 | 3 |
| 2026 | 10 | 12 | 4 | 11 |
| 2027 | | | | |
| Football Season | Senior Ladder Position | Reserves Ladder Position | Thirds / U/17's Ladder Position | Fourths / U/14's Ladder Position |

== Back To Bethanga ==
Since 2009 the Wodonga Saints have moved one home match back to the old Bethanga Football Ground on four occasions. The move has been widely welcomed by both the football club & greater Bethanga community.

| Year | G | B | Pts | Home | G | B | Pts | Away | Report |
|---|---|---|---|---|---|---|---|---|---|
| 2009 | 11 | 7 | 73 | Wodonga Saints | 16 | 11 | 107 | Mitta United | Report (Saturday April 18) |
| 2010-12 | No matches played | | | | | | | | |
| 2013 | 17 | 12 | 114 | Wodonga Saints | 10 | 11 | 71 | Tallangatta | Report (Saturday May 4) |
| 2014 | 11 | 7 | 73 | Wodonga Saints | 11 | 12 | 78 | Tallangatta | Report (Saturday April 12) |
| 2015 | 2 | 5 | 17 | Wodonga Saints | 49 | 23 | 317 | Tallangatta | Report (Saturday May 30) |
| 2016-19 | No matches scheduled | | | | | | | | |
| 2020 | Season abandoned due to COVID-19 | | | | | | | | |
| 2021-26 | No matches scheduled. | | | | | | | | |
2027
| Year | G | B | Pts | Home | G | B | Pts | Away | Report |
