= Wangaratta Football Club =

Wangaratta FNC

Names
- Full name: Wangaratta Football Netball Club
- Nickname: Magpies

Club details
- Founded: 1875; 151 years ago
- Colours
- Competition: Ovens & Murray Football League
- Premierships: O&MFNL 1sts:(15) 1925, 1933, 1936, 1938, 1946, 1949, 1950, 1951, 1952, 1957, 1961, 1976, 2007, 2008, 2017; O&KFNL 1sts:(6) 1905, 1906, 1920, 1931, 1932, 1941.
- Ground: Norm Minns Oval

Uniforms
Home

Other information
- Official website: Wangaratta FNC

The Wangaratta Magpies Football Club, officially known as the Wangaratta Magpies Football & Netball Club, is an Australian rules football club, which first played in the Ovens and Murray Football League in 1893 and is based in Wangaratta, Victoria at the Wangaratta Showgrounds and play on the Norm Minns Oval.

== Club History ==
On 20 June 1864, the first Wangaratta Football Club in Wangaratta was formed, with Edward Lucas, President, Henry B. K. Leigh as Secretary and Thomas Cusack and seven others as committee. The Wangaratta Football Club was then reformed in Wangaratta, in 1875, when matches were played intermittently against other local towns like – Albury, Beechworth, Benalla, Chiltern, Corowa, Howlong, Rutherglen, Tarrawingee and Wahgunyah.

Wangaratta played a number of matches against other local sides in the 1880's including Benalla, Swanpool.

There were two Wangaratta teams that entered the Ovens & Murray Football League in 1893, Wangaratta Central FC and West End FC (1893 only), with Wangaratta Central (Magpies) remaining in the O&MFA and moving between the Ovens & King Football League on a number of occasions prior to World War Two. These two teams played in the Wangaratta Football Association in 1892, with Wangaratta FC finishing on top of the ladder and winning the premiership.

In July, 1897, the club withdrew from the O&MFA competition after not winning any matches up until that point.

Wangaratta FC then joined the Murray Valley Junior Football Association and won the 1898 premiership, before rejoining the O&MFA for the 1899 season.

In July, 1900, Collingwood, 12.18 - 90 defeated Wangaratta, 2.8 - 20 in Wangaratta.

Wangaratta FC moved into the Ovens and King FL in its first year of competition in 1903.

Wangaratta's first golden era was between 1919 and 1926 when they played in eight consecutive senior football grand finals, with the first three in the Ovens & King Football League and the last five in the Ovens & Murray Football League, winning an O&KFL premiership in 1920 and an O&MFL premiership in 1925, under coach, Percy Rowe.

In late September 1931, Wangaratta (O&KFL premiers) defeated Weir United (O&MFL Premiers) in a challenge match to decide the champion club in the North East of Victoria. Then in 1932, Wangaratta (O&KFL Premiers) defeated Corowa (O&MFL Premiers) to once again be the North Eastern Victoria champion club.

Wangaratta FC entered two sides into the Ovens & King FL in 1941 and they both played off in the grand final, with the "Rainbows" defeating the more fancied Wangaratta team.

In 1945 Wangaratta entered a team in the Murray Valley Football League and they became undefeated premiers.

Wangaratta FC have been in the Ovens & Murray Football League continuously since 1946.

Wangaratta's second golden era was between 1945 and 1957 when they won six premierships, and were runners up in 1955, winning a record four consecutive premierships between 1949 and 1952 under their captain / coach, former Collingwood player, Mac Holten.

The club had a very lean period between 1997 and 2002, collecting six consecutive wooden spoons and losing 32 consecutive games between 1997 and 1999, but by the mid-2000s were playing finals and later played in seven O&MFNL senior football grand finals between 2007 and 2025, winning four. This included the 2022 grand final, but the club was stripped of its premiership flag for salary cap breaches in the 2022 season, a first in country football.

Since 2012, the club has fielded three football teams and four netball teams in the Ovens & Murray Football League.

== Football competition timeline ==
Seniors

- 1892: Wangaratta Football Association
- 1893–1897: Ovens & Murray Football Association
- 1898: Murray Valley Junior Football Association
- 1899–1902: Ovens & Murray Football Association
- 1903–1914: Ovens & King Football Association
- 1912: North East (Wednesday) Football Association
- 1915: Ovens & Murray Football Association
- 1916–1918: O&MFA & Club in recess due to World War One
- 1919–1921: Ovens & King Football Association
- 1922–1930: Ovens & Murray Football League
- 1931–1932: Ovens & King Football Association
- 1933–1940: Ovens & Murray Football League
- 1941: Ovens & King Football Association
- 1942–1944: Club in recess due to World War Two
- 1945: Murray Valley Patriotic Football League
- 1946–2019: Ovens & Murray Football League
- 2020: - O&MFL in recess due to COVID-19
- 2021–2024: Ovens & Murray Football League

Reserves

- 1930: Ovens & King Football League
- 1949–1952: Benalla Tungamah Football League
- 1953–2024: Ovens & Murray Football League

Thirds / Under 18's

- 1973–2024: Ovens & Murray Football League

== Football Premierships ==
Seniors

League	Total flags	Premiership year(s)	Runner up
Wangaratta Football Association	1	1892	
Murray Valley Junior Football Association	1	1898	
Ovens & King Football Association	6	1905, 1906, 1920, 1931, 1932, 1941	1908, 1909, 1910, 1919, 1921, 1941
Murray Valley Patriotic Football Association	1	1945	
Corowa & District Knockout Competition – "VFL Cup"	1	1949	
Ovens & Murray Football League	15	1925, 1933, 1936, 1938, 1946, 1949, 1950, 1951, 1952, 1957, 1961, 1976, 2007, 2008, 2017.	1922, 1923, 1924, 1926, 1955, 1964, 1965, 1966, 1969, 1977, 2018, 2019, 2025.

Reserves

League	Total flags	Premiership year(s)	Runner up
Benalla Tungamah Football League	1	1951	
Ovens & Murray Football League	5	1959, 1967, 1968, 1985, 2024	1964, 1965, 1966, 1978, 1984, 1993, 2014

Thirds

League	Total flags	Premiership year(s)	Runner up
Ovens & Murray Football League	9	1975, 1976, 1992, 2000, 2011, 2012, 2014, 2015, 2022	1974, 1978, 1979, 2000, 2006, 2007, 2016, 2017, 2019, 2024, 2025

== Football League Best & Fairest Award Winners ==
Seniors

- Ovens & Murray Football League
  - Morris Medal: 1933 to present day
    - 1933 - Fred Carey
    - 1953 - Tim Lowe
    - 1955 - Ray Preston
    - 1957 - Lance Oswald
    - 1969 - Jeff Hemphill
    - 1975 - Jack O'Halloran
    - 1976 - Jack O'Halloran
    - 2007 - Jonathon McCormick
    - 2010 - Jamie Allan
    - 2021 - Callum Moore

Reserves

- Ovens & Murray Football League
  - Ralph Marks Medal: 1953 - 1963
  - Les Cuddon Medal: 1964 - 1975
  - Leo Burke Medal: 1976–present day
    - 1963 - Ron Wales
    - 1967 - Alan Benton
    - 1992 - Tony Gleeson
    - 2003 - Colin McClounan
    - 2006, 2007, 2008, 2010, 2011 - Carl Norton

Thirds

- Ovens & Murray Football League
  - 3NE Award: 1973 - 1984
  - Leo Dean Award: 1985 to present day
    - 1974 - Mick Ketchup
    - 2013 - Louis Vescio
    - 2014 - Hugh Amery
    - 2015 - Hugh Amery

== Team of the Century ==
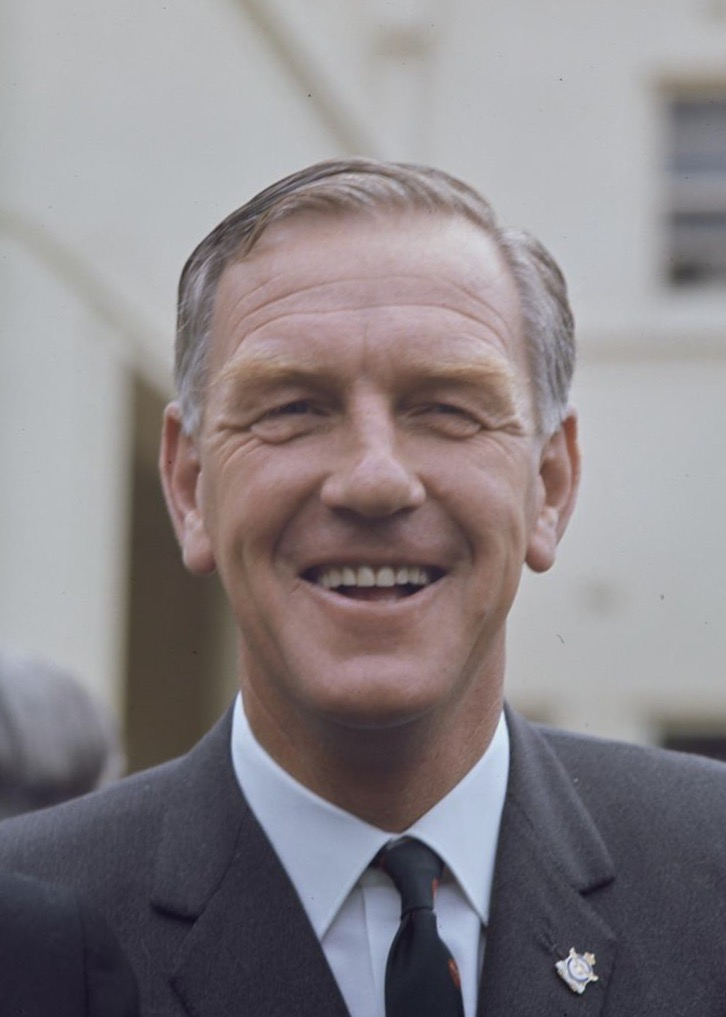
Mac Holten

Below is the Wangaratta FNC Team of the Century, that was announced on Saturday evening, 5 August 2006.

- Back line: Graeme Nish, Jack Ferguson, Kevin French
- Half backline: Fred Carey, Lionel Wallace, Jack McCormack
- Centre line: Des Steele, Alec Fraser, Lance Oswald
- Half forward line: Norm Minns, Ernie Ward, Mac Holten
- Forward line: Phil Nolan, John Leary, Bert Carey
- Ruck: Bill Comensoli
- Ruck Rover: Jack O'Halloran
- Rover: Tim Lowe
- Interchange: Graham Wood, Jeffrey Hemphill, Jason Lappin, Kevin Mack, Ken Nish
- Coach: Mac Holten
- Administration: Norm McGuffie, Jack White

== Ovens and Murray Football League - Hall of Fame Inductees ==
- 2005 - Norm Minns
- 2006 - Mac Holten
- 2010 - Tim Lowe
- 2013 - Bob Constable
- 2014 - Kevin Mack
- 2014 - Phil Nolan
- 2016 - John Henry
- 2016 - Jack O'Halloran
- 2017 - Kevin Allan
- 2018 - Jack McCormick
- 2024 - Graham Nish

== VFL / AFL Footballers ==
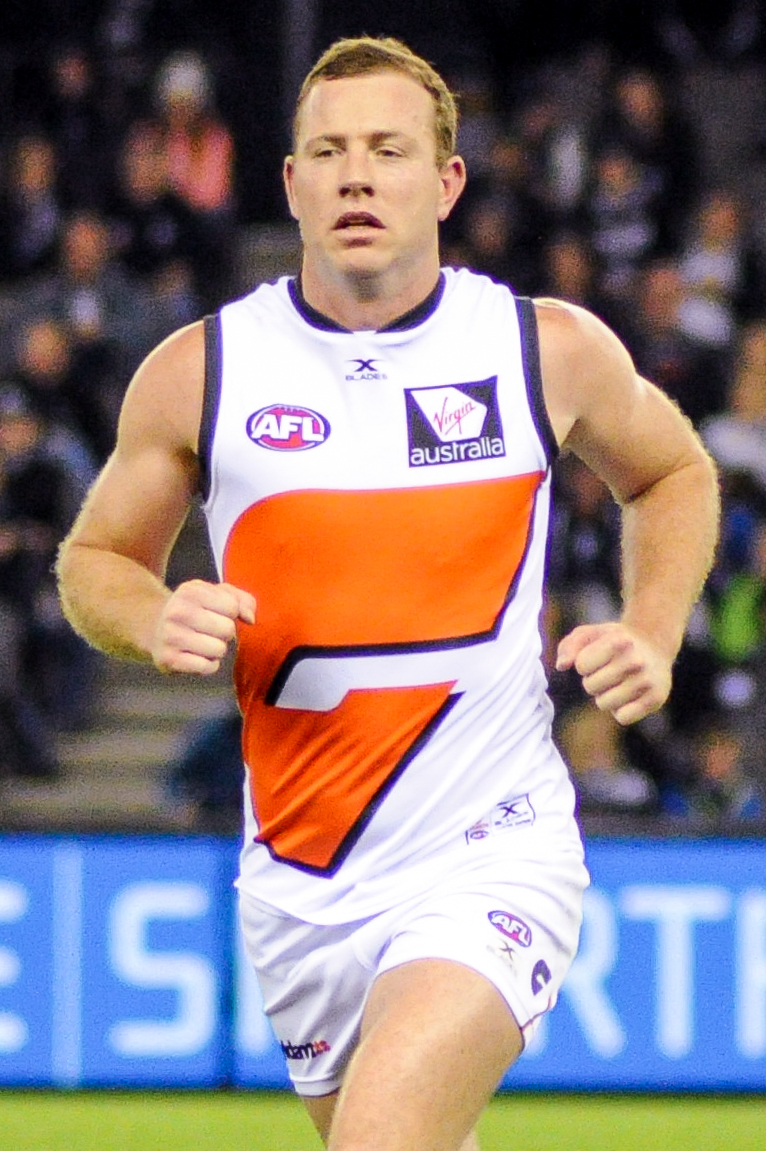
Steve Johnson, GWS

The following footballers played for Wangaratta FC prior to making their VFL / AFL debut & / or were drafted to an AFL club, with the year indicating their debut or year drafted.

- 1902 - Bill Hickey - South Melbourne
- 1906 - Charlie Meadway - Wangaratta
- 1912 - Gil Ebbott - St. Kilda
- 1926 - Jack Nolan - North Melbourne
- 1927 - Dinny Kelleher - Carlton
- 1927 - Allan Skehan - Carlton
- 1928 - Ray Usher - Melbourne
- 1929 - Percy Jones - Geelong
- 1930 - Arthur Mills - Hawthorn
- 1930 - Bert Mills - Hawthorn
- 1931 - Alex Fraser - St. Kilda
- 1932 - John Connell - St. Kilda
- 1932 - Leo Nolan - Melbourne
- 1950 - Mac Hill - Collingwood
- 1953 - Peter Hughes - Hawthorn
- 1953 - Lance Oswald - St. Kilda
- 1960 - Gary Holmes - St. Kilda
- 1960 - Ian Rowland - St. Kilda
- 1965 - Ian Montgomery - Collingwood
- 1966 - Ian Nicoll - Carlton
- 1984 - Darren Steele - North Melbourne
- 1988 - Damian Simmonds - Fitzroy
- 1989 - Danny Craven - St. Kilda
- 1989 - Daniel Frawley - Geelong
- 1990 - Chris Naish - Richmond
- 1991 - Daryl Donald - Geelong
- 1993 - Matthew Lappin - St. Kilda & Carlton
- 1993 - Jason Heatley - West Coast Eagles
- 1995 - Luke Norman - Melbourne
- 2002 - Steve Johnson - Geelong
- 2003 - Jonathon McCormick - Carlton
- 2007 - Daniel Boyle - Port Adelaide
- 2022 - Joe Richards - Collingwood/Port Adelaide
- 2024 - Joe Berry - Port Adelaide

== Most Football Games ==
Seniors

- 351 - Daine Porter
- 264 - Brett Keir
- 260 - Judd Porter
- 249 - Ken Nish
- 249 - Graham Wood
- 217 - John Leary
- 214 - Graeme Nish
- 210 - Kevin Mack
- 203 - Alec Fraser
- 200+ - Matt Kelly*
- 200+ - Chris Crimmins
- 200+ - Michael Bordignon*
- - * still playing

== Senior Football Honourboard ==
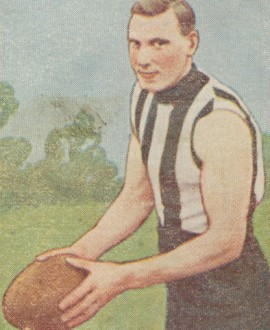
Percy Rowe, 1925 Wangaratta FC premiership captain/coach

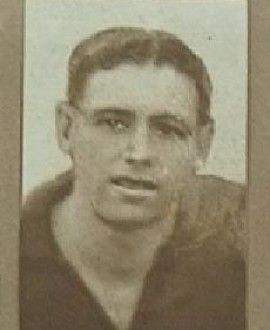
Norm Le Brun, 1938 Wangaratta FC premiership captain/coach

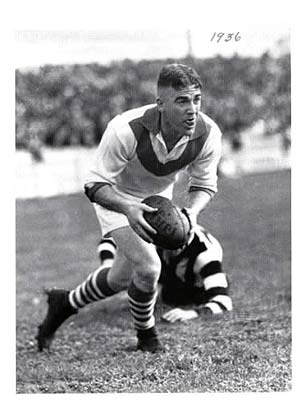
Laurie Nash, 1946 Wangaratta FC (O&MFL) captain/coach & 1946 Greta FC (O&KFL) premiership coach

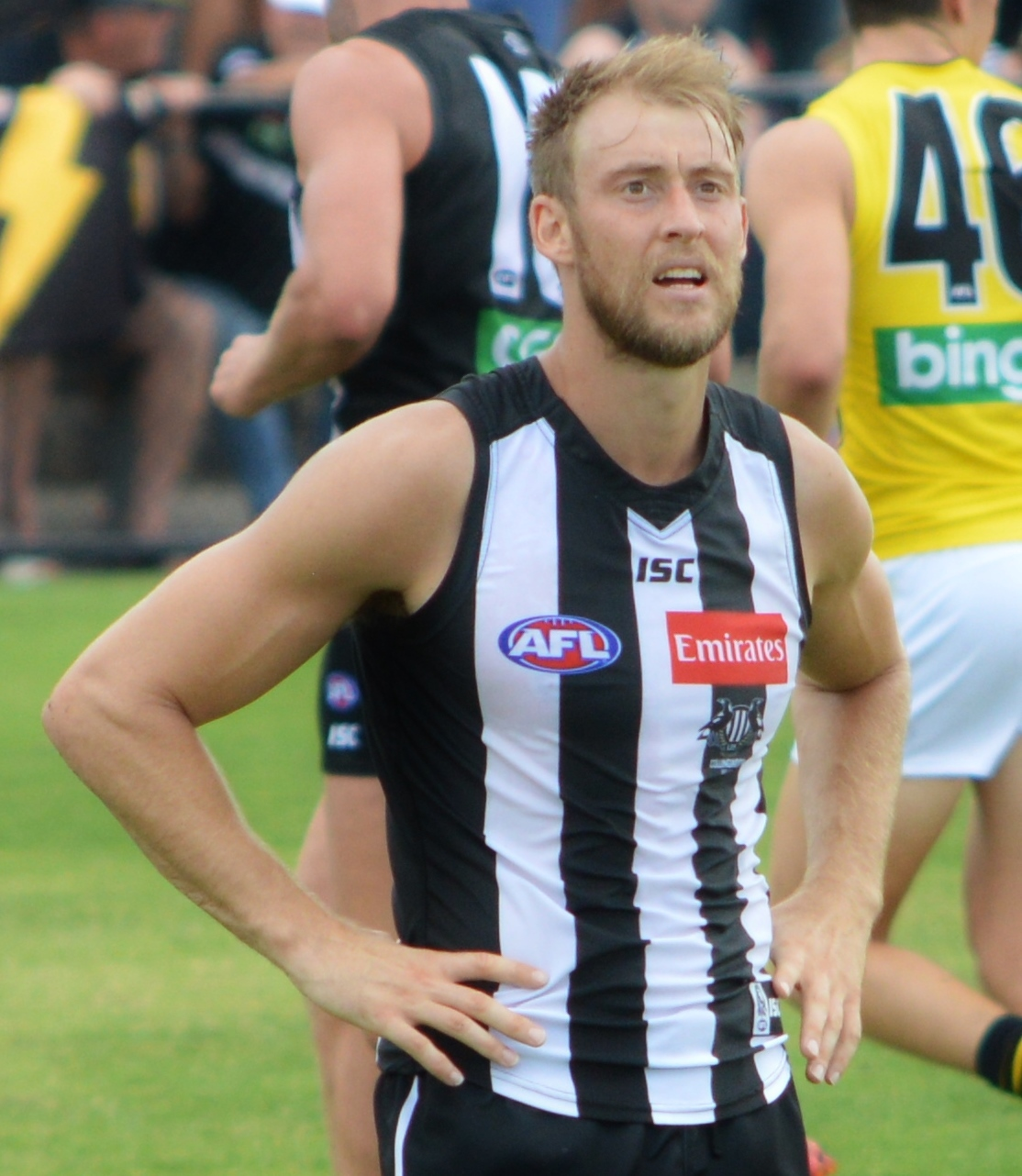
Ben Reid, 2022 Wangaratta FC captain/coach

Year	President	Secretary	Treasurer	Captain/Coach	Best & Fairest	Top Goalkicker	Ladder Position
1880				W L Clarke			
1881	Sanford	Banfield		Sanford			
1882		F Gray		C C Sanford			
1883		J H Tone	J H Tone				
1884				Sanford			
1885				Slattery			
1886				Taylor			
1887				Taylor			
1888							
1889							
1890	H G Griffiths	A McKay Jnr	A McKay Jnr				
1891		Chas Wilson					
1892				Jack Brew			1st. 5 wins, 1 draw. WFA Premiers
1893	W J Osboldstone	T Hishon	B Brown	G Carpenter			Joined O&MFA
1894	A Harrison	R Trembarth	J McCarthy				Equal 2nd
1895	A Harrison	E Hickey	A Harrison	Jack Brew			5th
1896	Clements	T Hishon	W Flanigan	M Walsh			Last. 0 wins, 12 losses
1897	A Harrison	F W May	W Flanigan				0 wins. Disbanded, July 1897
1898	G Powley	S Tough	R G Barry				MVJFA Premiers
1899	G Powley	T Laider	H A Murdoch				Rejoined O&MFA
1900	G Powley	J W Bird	H A Murdoch	J W Bird			
1901	P Cock	A C Fletcher	H A Murdoch				4th
1902		R Turner	H A Murdoch	J W Bird			4th
1903	Bryant						O&KFA.3rd.3 wins,3 losses,1 draw
1904	H A Murdoch	J Wllis	C Marshall	S Yoxall			
1905	H Smith	F H Brook &	Stuart	R J "Tot" Turner			O&K Premiers
		Mr. Stuart					
1906	George Maxwell	M J Cowman	A Ebbott	R J Turner			O&K Premiers
1907	George Maxwell	A Ebbott	A Ebbott				
1908	J Clark	H Frankland	W Murdoch				O&K Runners Up
1909	J Clark	J Teague	E Martin				O&K Runners Up
1910	C Teague	O Edwards	W Murdoch				O&K Runners Up
1911	C Teague	A Grassick	M O'Keefe				
1912	G Powley	P J Murphy	P J Murphy				
1913	G Marshall	H Hill	H Hill				Last.2 wins, 6 losses
1914	G Marshall	H Hill	H Hill	R Banbury		19: R Banbury	
1915-18							In recess > WW1
1919	A C Callander	L Howell	L Howell	R J Metcalfe	J Frawley	10: Atkinson	O&K Runners Up
1920	A C Callander	R Reid	R Reid	R J Metcalfe	Norm McGuffie	34: Denby	O&K Premiers
1921	A C Callander	L Howell	L Howell	R J Metcalfe		21: Flegg	O&K Runners Up
1922	A C Callander	L Howell	L Howell	Harry Smith		19: Flegg	O&M Runners Up
1923	A C Callander	E C Peverill	E C Peverill	Matt O'Donohue		23: A Flegg &	O&M Runners Up
						23: A Humphrey	
1924	A C Callander	F Marks	G McDonald	Matt O'Donohue		36: G Humphrey	O&M Runners Up
1925	A C Callander	S Smythe	J O'Shea	Percy Rowe		61: Percy Jones	O&M Premiers (undefeated, 1 draw)
1926	A C Callander	F Marks	J O'Shea	Percy Rowe		49: Allan Skehan	O&M Runners Up
1927	W J Powell	G McDonald	J O'Shea	Jim Boyd	J J Kelly	24: P Johnson	6th. 5 wins, 9 losses
1928	W J Powell	G McDonald	G McDonald	Ern Elliott		63: Jim Boyd	4th. 7 wins, 7 losses
1929	W J Powell	G McDonald	FH Enscoe	Dermot O'Brien &		67: Bert Carey	2nd. 9 wins, 5 losses
				Fred Carey			
1930	M J Duggan	G McDonald	FH Enscoe	Ernie Loveless		78: Bert Carey	5th. 7 wins, 7 losses
1931	J F Quinn	Nixon	Barnes	Fred Carey		83: Bert Carey	O&K Premiers
1932	J F Quinn	R Barnes	FH Enscoe	Fred Carey	Alec Fraser	76: Bert Carey	O&K Premiers
1933	F Baker	R Barnes	FH Enscoe	Fred Carey		85: Leo Nolan #	O&M Premiers
1934	F Baker	L Irving	W Brown	Fred Carey		80: Charlie Heavey	5th
1935	W J Powell	Norm J McGuffie	Norm J McGuffie	Joe Nunan		109: Charlie Heavey#	1st. 10 wins, 7 losses, lost both finals
1936	A C Jones	Norm J McGuffie	Norm J McGuffie	Fred Carey	Bert Carey	48: Bert Carey	2nd. 12 wins, 6 losses. O&M Premiers
1937	A C Jones	Norm J McGuffie	Norm J McGuffie	Fred Carey	Ernie Ward	64: Keith Thompson #	Last
1938	W J Powell	Norm J McGuffie	Norm J McGuffie	Norm Le Brun		43:Norm Le Brun	O&M Premiers
1939	C Pratt	H T Lean	H T Lean	Norm Le Brun		56: Reg Sudholz	5th
1940	W J Powell	H T Lean	H T Lean	Alec Fraser	Ernie Ward	53: Ernie Ward	4th. 5 wins, 5 losses
1941	T Ferguson	H T Lean	H T Lean	Ernie Ward		59: Ernie Ward	O&K Premiers: Rainbows FC
1941				Ron Bryant			O&K Runners Up: Wang FC
1942-43							In recess > WW2
1944	G Baker	J Prendergast					
1945	G Baker	J Faithful	J Faithful	Ron Bryant/George Robbins	N Bowman		MVPFL Premiers
1946	W J Powell	H T Lean	H T Lean	Laurie Nash	Jack Ferguson	64: Ernie Ward #	2nd. 11 wins, 2 losses. O&M Premiers
1947	W J Powell	R Howard	R Howard	Tom Tribe	Jack Plaisted	26: Doug Ferguson	5th.
1948	E C Etches	H T Lean	H T Lean	Tom Tribe	Tim Lowe	34: Doug Ferguson*	1st. 10 wins, 4 losses Lost both finals
1949	Norm J McGuffie	R Howard &	R Howard &	Mac Holten	Ken Nish	71: Max Williams	1st. O&M Premiers
		A J Brown	A J Brown				
1950	Norm J McGuffie	R Howard	A J Brown	Mac Holten	Tim Lowe	84: Max Williams #	1st. O&M Premiers
1951	Norm J McGuffie	A J Brown	J Cood	Mac Holten	Tim Lowe	98: Max Williams #	1st. O&M Premiers
1952	Norm J McGuffie	A J Brown	J Cood	Mac Holten	Tim Lowe	68: Max Bussell	O&M Premiers
1953	George Cundy	Jack White	F Ballantine	Mac Holten	Tim Lowe	61: Jock Gardner	1st. 15 wins, 2 losses. Lost both finals
1954	George Cundy	Jack White	F Ballantine	Mac Holten	W Luck	24: Ray Preston	8th. 4 wins, 14 losses
1955	George Cundy	Jack White	W Anderson	Mac Holten	Ray Preston	62: Lance Oswald	1st. 15 wins, 6 losses. Runners Up
1956	L Twamley	Owen Paton	W Anderson	Bill Comensoli/Mac Holten	Ray Preston &	55: Lance Oswald	6th: 10 wins, 8 losses
					Lance Oswald		
1957	L Twamley	F Bailes	W Anderson	Jack McDonald	Lance Oswald	95: Lance Oswald	2nd: 14 wins, 8 losses. O&M Premiers
1958	L Twamley	F Bailes	J R Patterson	Jack McDonald	Bill Comensoli	58: Jack McDonald #	
1959	Norm J McGuffie	F Bailes	J Howlett	Neville Waller	Kevin Mack	35: Ian Rowland	
1960	Norm J McGuffie	F Bailes	J R Patterson	Neville Waller	Kevin O'Keefe	57: Bob Constable #	7th: 7 wins, 11 losses
1961	Norm J McGuffie	F Bailes	J R Patterson	Neville Waller	Len Richards	53: Ron McDonald	3rd: 14 wins, 5 losses. O&M Premiers
1962	Norm J McGuffie	Owen Paton	J R Patterson	Neville Waller	Bill Traill	49: Ron McDonald	4th: 12 wins, 6 losses, 1 draw
1963	Owen Paton	Ed Tippett	J R Anderson	Neville Waller	Bernie Killeen	33: Jeff Hemphill	3rd: 12 wins, 6 losses
1964	Owen Paton	Ed Tippett	J R Anderson	Ron Critchley	Kevin Mack	62: Ron Critchley	2nd: 14 wins, 4 losses. Runners Up
1965	Gus Boyd	Ed Tippett	J R Anderson	Ron Critchley	Des Steele	59: Geoff Scott	1st: 13 wins, 5 losses. Runners Up
1966	Gus Boyd	Ed Tippett	J R Anderson	Ron Critchley	Jeff Hemphill	80: Geoff Scott	1st: 14 wins, 4 losses. Runners Up
1967	Gus Boyd	Ed Tippett	J R Anderson	Trevor Steer	Ron Critchley	92: Geoff Scott* #	4th: 11 wins, 8 losses
1968	Gus Boyd	Ed Tippett	J R Anderson	Trevor Steer	Graeme Nish	18: Neville Smedley	5th: 11 wins, 7 losses
1969	Gus Boyd	W Woods	J R Anderson	Trevor Steer	Mick Tanner	47: Mick Tanner*	2nd: 14 wins, 7 losses. Runners Up
1970	Gus Boyd	W Woods	W Sharp	Trevor Steer	Des Steele	43: John Leary*	4th: 10 wins, 9 losses
1971	Gus Boyd	Frank Holt	P Clode	Geoff Rosenow	Graeme Nish	51: John Leary	6th: 9 wins, 8 losses, 1 draw
1972	Gus Boyd	Frank Holt	G O'Halloran	Geoff Rosenow	John Leary	30: Richard Allan*	4th: 13 wins, 7 losses (Final 5)
1973	Gus Boyd	G Milson	G O'Halloran	Geoff Rosenow	Geoff Rosenow	62: Gordon McPhan*	3rd: 14 wins, 6 losses. Lost both finals.
1974	Jack White	John Kerr	G O'Halloran	Geoff Rosenow	Graeme Nish	60: Mick Pavone*	5th: 12 wins, 7 losses
1975	Jack White	John Kerr	G O'Halloran	Harry Skreja	Jack O'Halloran	95: Harry Skreja	2nd: 13 wins, 7 losses, 1 draw. Lost P Final.
1976	Jack White	John Kerr	G O'Halloran	Phillip Nolan	Jack O'Halloran	83: John Leary #	2nd. 13 wins, 5 losses. O&M Premiers
1977	Jack White	G Wise	G O'Halloran	Phillip Nolan	Phillip Nolan	69: John Leary	3rd. 9 wins, 8 losses, 1 draw. Runners Up
1978	Jack White	G Wise	R Barrett	Phillip Nolan	Phillip Murray	44: John Leary	10th (last) 4 wins, 14 losses
1979	Jack White	G Wise	R Barrett	Vin Doolan	Daryl Price	46: T ? Nolan	6th. 9 wins, 9 losses
1980	Neville Sanderson	J Dawson	R Barrett	Vin Doolan	Vin Doolan	44: Peter Mulrooney	1st. 13 wins, 4 losses, 1 draw. Lost both finals
1981	Neville Sanderson	J Dawson	R Barrett	Vin Doolan	Mark Dean	49: John Leary	7th. 6 wins, 12 losses
1982	Neville Sanderson	G Hutchinson	R Barrett	Phil Nolan	Gary Voss	30: John Leary	10th (last) 2 wins, 16 losses
1983	Gerry Dowling	G Hutchinson	R Barrett	Neville Hogan	Greg Mulrooney	27: Peter Mulrooney	9th. 2 wins, 16 losses
1984	Gerry Dowling	G Hutchinson	R Barrett	Neville Hogan	Greg Mulrooney	50: Ian Denny	8th. 7 wins, 11 losses
1985	Gerry Dowling	G Hutchinson	R Barrett	John Gannon	Danny Craven	71: Steven Adamo	7th. 7 wins, 11 losses
1986	Paul Douthie	Merv Crimmins	R Barrett	John Gannon	David Nugent	104: Steven Adamo #	5th. 12 wins, 6 losses
1987	John Dawson	Merv Crimmins	Trevor Smethurst	John Gannon	Peter Mulrooney	106: Steven Adamo #	7th. 6 wins, 12 losses
1988	John Dawson	Merv Crimmins	Trevor Smethurst	Ray Card	Duane Kerwin	74: Steven Adamo	4th. 12 wins, 6 losses
1989	Sid Wright	Merv Crimmins	Trevor Smethurst	Ray Card	Mark Lincoln	53: Steven Adamo	2nd. 15 wins, 5 losses.(W Raiders join O&M)
1990	Sid Wright	Merv Crimmins	R Barrett	Ray Card	Shane Lockyer	26: Luke Norman	9th. 6 wins, 14 losses
1991	Bob Andrews	Merv Crimmins	R Barrett	Charlie Walder	Charlie Walder	43: Damian Simmonds	6th. 12 wins, 7 losses, 1 draw
1992	Bob Andrews			Charlie Walder	Brian Blood	88: John Henry #	5th. 11 wins, 9 losses
1993	Bob Andrews			Brian Walsh	Jason Lappin	75: John Henry	5th. 12 wins, 8 losses
1994	J Davidson			Graeme Cordy &	Michael James	35: Mark Higgs	10th. 3 wins, 14 losses, 2 byes
				Ray Card			
1995	Bob Head			Ray Card	Simon Dean	44: John Henry	10th. 2 wins, 15 losses, 1 draw
1996	Bob Head			Ray Card	Matthew Curran	22: Colin McClounan	9th. 4 wins, 14 losses
						22: Matthew Curran	
						22: Andrew Haring	
1997	Lindsey Horrocks			Maurice Wingate &	G Barrow	27: S.Zamaicyl	11th (last)
				Rob Richards			(Benalla joined the GVFNL in 1998)
1998	Lindsey Horrocks			Gary Cameron	Martin Dillon	22: B Phillips	10th (last) 0 wins
1999	Lindsey Horrocks			Gary Cameron	Martin Dillon	23: Luke Norman	10th (last)
2000	Gary Nevin			Colin McClounan	Luke Norman	33: Luke Norman	10th (last)
2001	Gary Nevin			Colin McClounan	Luke Norman	34: John Henry	10th (last)
2002	Peter Whittlesea			John Henry	Jason Lappin	57: Damian Lang	10th (last)
2003	Peter Whittlesea			John Henry	Jason Lappin	63: Damian Lang #	8th: 5 wins, 13 losses
2004	Russell Higgs	Prue Minns		John Henry	Matthew Byers	88: Damian Lang #	5th: 8 wins, 11 losses
2005	Russell Higgs	Ken Farrell		John Henry	Jason Lappin	47: Damian Lang	2nd: 14 wins, 7 losses. Lost P Final
2006	Paul Challman	Ken Farrell	Brian Hargreaves	John Henry	Judd Porter	34: John Henry	9th: 5 wins, 13 losses.
2007	Paul Challman	Ken Farrell	Brian Hargreaves	Jason Lappin	Jonathon McCormick	47: John Henry	1st. 16 wins, 5 losses. O&M Premiers
2008	Paul Challman	Ken Farrell	Brian Hargreaves	Jason Lappin	Sam Higgs	44: Jarrod Hayse	1st. 17 wins, 2 losses, 1 draw. O&M Premiers
2009	Paul Challman	Ken Farrell	Brian Hargreaves	Jason Lappin	Jonathon McCormick	45: Luke Mullins	4th. 11 wins, 9 losses
2010	Paul Challman	Pam Voss	Brian Hargreaves	Judd Porter	Jamie Allan	35: Dale Whelan	6th. 9 wins, 9 losses
2011	Paul Challman	Pam Voss	Brian Hargreaves	Judd Porter	Daine Porter	32: Luke Morgan	5th. 11 wins, 8 losses
2012	Paul Challman	Ken Farrell	Brian Hargreaves	Judd Porter	Daine Porter	60: James Wong	7th. 5 wins, 13 losses
2013	Colin McClounan	Ken Farrell	Kristian Hedin	Mark Knobel	Matthew Crossman	63: James Wong	6th. 6 wins, 11 losses, 1 draw
2014	Colin McClounan	Ken Farrell	Kristian Hedin	Mark Knobel	Jamie Allan	50: Joel Harris	6th. 7 wins, 10 losses, 1 draw
2015	Colin McClounan	Ken Farrell	Glen Bouchier	Mark Knobel &	Daine Porter	42: Robert Hicks	7th. 6 wins, 12 losses
				Brendan Cairns			
2016	Colin McClounan	Ken Farrell	Glen Bouchier	Brendan Cairns	Matthew Crossman	42: Michael Newton	7th. 8 wins, 9 losses, 1 draw
2017	Colin McClounan	Ken Farrell	P Gay	Dean Stone	Michael Bordignon	74: Michael Newton	2nd:17 wins, 5 losses. O&M Premiers
2018	Tony Goodison	Ken Farrell	S Comensoli	Dean Stone	Joe Richards	81: Michael Newton #	3rd: 16 wins, 6 losses. Runner Up
2019	Tony Goodison	Ken Farrell	Rob Doolan	Luke Morgan	Joe Richards	44: Ben Speight	3rd: 17 wins, 4 losses. Runner Up
2020	Colin McClounan			Luke Morgan			No O&MFNL season > COVID-19
2021	Colin McClounan			Dean Stone	Abraham Ankers	44: Michael Newton #	2nd. 11 wins, 2 losses.No final series>COVID-19
	& Ellyn O'Brien						
2022	Ellyn O'Brien	Tamara Marjanovic	Rob Doolan	Ben Reid	Joe Richards	68:Callum Moore*	1st: 19 wins, 1 loss. Won G Final, stripped of premiership.
2023	Ellyn O'Brien	Tamara Marjanovic	Rob Doolan	Ben Reid	Daniel Sharrock	81:Callum Moore*#	3rd:12 wins, 7 losses, 2 byes. Lost P Final
2024	Ellyn O'Brien	Tamara Marjanovic	Megan O'Keefe	Ben Reid	Aidan Tilley	53:Callum Moore*	3rd:11 wins, 9 losses, Lost 1st S Final
2025	John Henry	Kate Sleeman	Megan O'Keefe	Jason Heatley	Alex Federico	55: Xavier Laverty*	5th: 14 wins, 8 losses. Runner Up
2026	John Henry	Kate Sleeman	Megan O'Keefe	Jason Heatley	Joel Stevens	40: James McClounan*	1st: 17 wins, 3 losses. Runner Up
2027							
Year	President	Secretary	Treasurer	Captain / Coach	Best & Fairest	Top Goalkicker	Ladder Position

- - Ladder position is at the end of the home & away series of games
- - # Also won the O&M goal kicking award
- - * Includes goals kicked in finals
- - wins / losses also includes finals, when details checked.

== Links ==
- 1926 - Wangaratta FC Officials
- 1926 - Wangaratta FC & St. Patrick's FC team photos (June, 1926)
- 1926 - Ovens & Murray FL Grand Final team photos: Wangaratta FC & St. Patrick's FC (September, 1926)
- 1929 - Wangaratta FC team photo
- 1930 - Wangaratta FC & East Albury FC team photos
- 1931 - Wangaratta FC & Moyhu FC team photos
- 1933 - Wangaratta FC & Border United FC team photo
- 1934 - Wangaratta FC & Rutherglen FC team photos
- 1937 - Wangaratta FC & Corowa FC team photos
- 1938 - Ovens & Murray FL Grand Final team photos: Wangaratta FC & Yarrawonga FC
- 1939 - Wangaratta CYMS FC team photo
- 1941 - Ovens & King FL Premiers: Rainbows FC team photo
- 1945 - Murray Valley Patriotic Football League Premiers: Wangaratta FC grand final day team photo
- 1945 - Murray Valley Patriotic Football League Premiers: Wangaratta FC team photo (undefeated)
- 1946 - Wodonga FC & Wangaratta FC team photos
- 1949 - O&MFL Premiers: Wangaratta FC team photo
- 1949 - Wangaratta FC Reserves team photo
- 1950 - O&MFL Premiers: Wangaratta FC team photo
- 1969 - O&MFL Grand Final Critic
