= Jack Nolan (Australian footballer) =

Australian rules footballer (1902–1971)

Personal information
- Full name: Jack Nolan
- Born: 14 May 1902; Wangaratta, Victoria
- Died: 28 October 1971 (aged 69)
- Original teams: Wangaratta, Leongatha
- Height: 188 cm (6 ft 2 in)
- Weight: 83 kg (183 lb)

Playing career^{1}
Years	Club	Games (Goals)
1926	North Melbourne	9 (10)
- ^{1} Playing statistics correct to the end of 1926.

Jack Nolan (14 May 1902 – 28 October 1971) was an Australian rules footballer who played with North Melbourne in the Victorian Football League (VFL).

Nolan was born in Wangaratta and educated at the Wangaratta High School and went onto be a teacher at the Leongatha High School between 1925 and 1928.

Nolan was recruited to North Melbourne from Leongatha in 1926.

Nolan was a brother of VFL players, Clarrie and Leo. Nolan along with his brothers, established Nolan Brothers Sports Stores in Albury, Leeton and Wangaratta, which became one of the largest inland sports depots in Australia.

Jack returned to the North East of Victoria and later played with West Albury.

Nolan later became President of the Albury Athletic Club in the 1940s.
