= Ron Critchley =

Australian rules footballer (1940–2025)

Personal information
- Full name: Ronald Banks Critchley
- Born: 16 December 1940
- Died: 3 June 2025 (aged 84)
- Original team: Marysville
- Height: 183 cm (6 ft 0 in)
- Weight: 83 kg (183 lb)

Playing career^{1}
Years	Club	Games (Goals)
1960	Hawthorn	3 (0)
- ^{1} Playing statistics correct to the end of 1960.

Ronald Banks Critchley (16 December 1940 – 3 June 2025) was an Australian rules footballer who played with Hawthorn in the Victorian Football League (VFL).

Critchley commenced his senior football career with Marysville Football Club in the Yarra Valley Football League, as a 16 year old, before heading off to teacher's college. He played six reserves matches with Hawthorn in 1959, but returned to Marysville and played in a one-point grand final loss.

Critchley won the 1960 VFL Reserves goalkicking award and made his VFL senior football, playing three games in 1960 and played in a VFL Reserves grand final loss to Geelong.

Critchley did not play football in 1961 due to a shoulder reconstruction, but then won Hawthorn's 1962 Reserves best and fairest award.

Critchley accepted a teaching position at Murmungee Primary School and also accepted Whorouly Football Club's offer as captain-coach, but Hawthorn would not clear him until five matches into the Ovens & King Football League's season and despite only playing 13 matches won the 1963 league best and fairest award, the Tip Lean Trophy.

Critchley then captained-coached the Wangaratta Football Club from 1964 to 1966 in the Ovens & Murray Football League for three years, for three successive grand final losses. Critchley played under Trevor Steer in 1967 and kicked 139 goals during his four years in the O&MFL.

Critchley later had stints at Whorouly, Eaglehawk, Mount Pleasant and Coldstream.

Critchley died on 3 June 2025, at the age of 84.
