= Bert Mills =

Australian rules footballer (1910–1984)

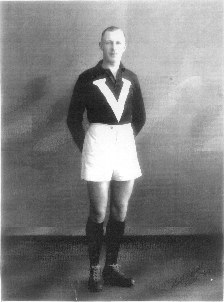

Personal information
- Full name: Albert Edward Mills
- Born: 16 February 1910; Wahgunyah, Victoria
- Died: 6 May 1984 (aged 74)
- Original teams: Bethanga, Wangaratta
- Height: 180 cm (5 ft 11 in)
- Weight: 86 kg (190 lb)

Playing career^{1}
Years	Club	Games (Goals)
1930–1942	Hawthorn	196 (60)

Coaching career
Years	Club	Games (W–L–D)
1940–1941	Hawthorn	36 (10–26–0)
- ^{1} Playing statistics correct to the end of 1942.

Career highlights
- 3× Hawthorn best and fairest: 1933, 1935, 1939; Hawthorn captain: 1932, 1934, 1938, 1940–1941; Hawthorn Hall of Fame; Hawthorn Team of the Century

Albert Edward Mills (16 February 1910 – 6 May 1984) was an Australian rules footballer who played for and captained Hawthorn in the Victorian Football League (VFL).

== Football career ==
Mills and his older brother Arthur began their careers playing for Bethanga in the 1926 and 1927 Kiewa & District Football Association grand finals. The Mills family then moved to Oxley, near Wangaratta, and the pair played with nearby Wangaratta Football Club in 1929. In 1930, both brothers made their debuts for the Hawthorn Football Club. Bert Mills won Hawthorn's 'most consistent player' award in his first season of VFL football.

Mills usually played as a ruckman, but was also used at centre half-back. He captained Hawthorn at various times during his career, beginning in 1932, and then in single seasons during 1934 and 1938 before his final stint from 1940 until 1941 as captain-coach.

During his time at Hawthorn, Mills won their best and fairest award three times, in 1933, 1935 and 1939. Mills was also presented with a life membership medallion in 1939. He represented Victoria in interstate football, doing so on 11 occasions. In 1936, Mills won Hawthorn's 'most popular player' award, which was sponsored by the Hoyts Palace Theatre, Glenferrie.

He was named on the back pocket in Hawthorn's official 'Team of the Century'.

== Honours and achievements ==
- 3× Hawthorn best and fairest: 1933, 1935, 1939
- Hawthorn captain: 1932, 1934, 1938, 1940–1941
- Hawthorn Hall of Fame
- Hawthorn Team of the Century
- Hawthorn life member
