= Skehan =

Skehan is a surname. It may refer to:

- Allan Skehan (1906–2004), Australian rules footballer
- Donal Skehan (born 1986), Irish television personality and musician
- John Skehan (1922–1992), Irish broadcaster
- Noel Skehan (born 1944), Irish hurler
- Patrick W. Skehan (1909-1980), American Old Testament semitic scholar
- Phil Skehan (1894-1921), Australian rules footballer
