= Gil Ebbott =

Australian rules footballer

Personal information
- Full name: Gilbert Henry Ebbott
- Born: 26 August 1890; Chewton, Victoria
- Died: 9 February 1960 (aged 69); Newcastle, New South Wales
- Original teams: Castlemaine, Wangaratta
- Height: 168 cm (5 ft 6 in)
- Weight: 58 kg (128 lb)

Playing career^{1}
Years	Club	Games (Goals)
1912	St Kilda	2 (2)
- ^{1} Playing statistics correct to the end of 1912.

Gilbert Henry Ebbott (26 August 1890 – 9 February 1960) was an Australian rules footballer who played with St Kilda in the Victorian Football League (VFL).

Ebbott was recruited from Wangaratta in the Ovens & Murray Football League and made his debut against Essendon in round 17 on Saturday, 23 August 1912. In the two games played at St. Kilda, he kicked two goals.

Ebbott was captain-coach of Koroit in the Western District Football Association in 1914 and lost a close grand final to Warrnambool.

== Family ==
Gil Ebbott married Annie Fleming on October 7, 1922. They had three children.
