= Charlie Meadway =

Australian rules footballer

Personal information
- Full name: Charles Bernard Meadway
- Born: 16 October 1879; Dunedin, New Zealand
- Died: 1 January 1962 (aged 82); Hawthorn, Victoria
- Original team: Wangaratta (O&KFA)
- Height: 175 cm (5 ft 9 in)
- Weight: 72 kg (159 lb)

Playing career^{1}
Years	Club	Games (Goals)
1906	Carlton	1 (0)
1907	Collingwood	3 (0)
Total		4 (0)
- ^{1} Playing statistics correct to the end of 1907.

Charles Bernard Meadway (16 October 1879 – 1 January 1962) was an Australian rules footballer who played with Carlton and Collingwood in the Victorian Football League (VFL).
