= Joe Nunan =

Australian rules footballer, born 1904

Personal information
- Full name: James Joseph Nunan
- Born: 23 December 1904; Kilmore, Victoria
- Died: 6 August 1971 (aged 66); Heidelberg, Victoria
- Original teams: St Patrick's College, Ballarat, Brunswick YMCA
- Height: 183 cm (6 ft 0 in)
- Weight: 83 kg (183 lb)

Playing career^{1}
Years	Club	Games (Goals)
1925–27	Footscray	27 (6)
- ^{1} Playing statistics correct to the end of 1927.

James Joseph Nunan (23 December 1904 – 6 August 1971) was an Australian rules footballer who played with Footscray in the Victorian Football League (VFL).

Nunan was educated at St Patrick's College, Ballarat where he was a champion school athlete and played football in the school first eighteen team in 1923.

Nunan was granted a permit to play with Footscray in late May 1925 after playing with the Footscray reserves.

Nunan played with Footscray reserves in 1928, then played with Essendon reserves in 1929 1930, and 1931.

In April 1932, Nunan was cleared from Essendon to North Melbourne where he played VFL reserves football.

According to this article reference, Nunan was cleared from North Melbourne to the Waratahs Football Club in the Ovens and King Football League in May 1934, where he was captain-coach in 1936 but he actually played with Wangaratta in the Ovens and Murray Football League in 1934 and was Wangaratta's captain-coach in 1935.

In June 1936, the Education Department announced that teacher, Joe Nunan would be transferred from the Peechelba State School to Tylden, Victoria.

In 1951, Nunan was appointed as coach of the Ballan Football Club in the Bacchus Marsh & Melton Football Association
