= Leo Nolan (footballer) =

Australian rules footballer (1910–1993)

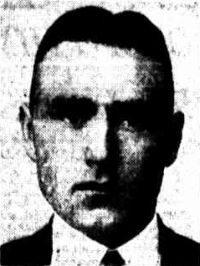

Personal information
- Full name: Leo Anthony Nolan
- Born: 9 February 1910
- Died: 11 February 1993 (aged 83)
- Original teams: Wangaratta, Wodonga, Maryborough
- Height: 180 cm (5 ft 11 in)
- Weight: 79.5 kg (175 lb)

Playing career^{1}
| Years | Club | Games (Goals) |
| 1932 | Melbourne | 6 (4) |
- ^{1} Playing statistics correct to the end of 1932.

Leo Anthony Nolan (9 February 1910 – 11 February 1993) was an Australian rules footballer who played with Melbourne in the Victorian Football League (VFL). He who was originally from the Wangaratta Football Club, but played with Maryborough in 1931.

Educated at the Wangaratta High School, Nolan developed an early liking for football. He originally played with Wangaratta then played in a railway competition on the Heidelberg line for one season, and showed promise. Then he shifted to the Chiltern & District Football Association and had one season with Wodonga. His railway employment necessitated his being at Mildura for two seasons, and he played there.

Nolan then had one Ballarat Football League premiership season at Maryborough in 1931 and was then transferred to Melbourne in 1932.

Cleared to Wangaratta in early 1933, he kicked 85 goals in an Ovens and Murray Football League premiership season.

In 1934 he joined Leeton Football Club and set up a Nolan Brothers Sports Store in Leeton. He was an outstanding local cricketer, golfer and tennis player, winning many titles during his time at Leeton.

Nolan's brothers Clarrie and Jack both played VFL with North Melbourne.
