= Neville Waller =

Australian rules footballer

Personal information
- Full name: Francis John Neville Waller
- Born: 17 September 1932; Northcote, Victoria
- Died: 10 January 1998 (aged 65)
- Original team: Glenhuntly Amateurs
- Height: 183 cm (6 ft 0 in)
- Weight: 87 kg (192 lb)

Playing career^{1}
Years	Club	Games (Goals)
1953–1958	Collingwood	84 (21)
- ^{1} Playing statistics correct to the end of 1958.

Career highlights
- Collingwood premiership side 1953

Francis John Neville Waller (17 September 1932 – 10 January 1998) was an Australian rules footballer, who played in the Victorian Football League (VFL).

He played as centre half back when the Magpies downed Geelong in the 1953 Grand Final, and played in a back pocket in the losing grand finals of 1955 and 1956 against Melbourne.

Waller was captain - coach of Wangaratta from 1959 to 1963, including their 1961 Ovens & Murray Football League premiership, in which he kicked 88 goals for Wangaratta FC in that time.
