= George Card =

Australian rules footballer

Personal information
- Full name: George Card
- Born: 14 September 1924
- Died: 15 November 2002 (aged 78)
- Original team: Yallourn
- Height: 193 cm (6 ft 4 in)
- Weight: 83 kg (183 lb)

Playing career^{1}
Years	Club	Games (Goals)
1946–48	Geelong	46 (3)
- ^{1} Playing statistics correct to the end of 1948.

George Card (14 September 1924 – 15 November 2002) was an Australian rules footballer who played with Geelong in the Victorian Football League (VFL).

Card returned to Yallourn as captain-coach in 1949.

Father of former Geelong player, Ray Card.
