= Lance Oswald =

Australian rules footballer (1937–2019)

Personal information
- Born: 14 February 1937
- Died: 20 March 2019 (aged 82); Heidelberg, Victoria, Australia
- Original team: Wangaratta

Playing career^{1}
Years	Club	Games (Goals)
1953–1957	Wangaratta	73 (218)
1957–1963	St Kilda	107 (104)
1963–1974	Strathmerton	210
Total		390 (322)
- ^{1} Playing statistics correct to the end of 1963.

Career highlights
- Wangaratta Junior Football League U/18 Best & Fairest 1950; Wangaratta Premiership 1957; Ovens & Murray Football League Morris Medal 1957; Ovens & Murray Football League Leading Goalkicker 1957 (90); St Kilda best and fairest 1960–1961; Victorian state representative 1960-61; Strathmerton Premiership captain/coach 1964; St. Kilda Team of the Century 2003; St. Kilda Hall of Fame 2008

Lancelot William Oswald (14 February 1937 – 20 March 2019) was an Australian rules footballer who played for St Kilda Football Club in the Victorian Football League (VFL).

== Biography ==
Oswald originally played for South Wanderers Junior Football Club in the Wangaratta Junior Football League (WJFL), winning the Under 18 WJFL best and fairest in 1950, before making his senior football debut with Wangaratta in the Ovens & Murray Football League(O&MFL) in 1953.

After a standout 1957 season, where he won the league goal-kicking award, shared the O&MFL best and fairest, represented the O&MFL in the Victorian country football championships, and then kicked the winning goal for Wangaratta against North Albury in the 1957 O&MFL grand final. Oswald was then recruited by Victorian Football League (VFL) side, St Kilda.

He played as a roaming centreman for the Saints, and was considered the best in the state in that position from 1960 to 1961 when he also won two best and fairests.

Oswald decided to leave St. Kilda after the 1963 VFL season and was captain / coach of Strathmerton for nine years, leading them to the 1964 Murray Football League premiership and playing 210 games and finally retiring as a player at aged 37 in 1974!

He was later named on the wing in St Kilda's Team of the Century and was inducted into the St Kilda Hall of Fame in 2008.
