= Ray Card =

Australian rules footballer, born 1957

Personal information
- Born: 4 April 1957 (age 69)
- Original team: Morwell
- Debut: Round 8: 21 May 1977, Geelong vs. Essendon, at Kardinia Park

Playing career^{1}
Years	Club	Games (Goals)
1977–1987	Geelong	110 (4)
- ^{1} Playing statistics correct to the end of 1987.

Ray Card (born 4 April 1957) is a former Australian rules footballer who played for the Geelong Football Club in the Victorian Football League (VFL).

== Football career ==
Card was recruited from the Morwell Football Club, where he won their best and fairest in 1976, making his VFL debut with Geelong in round 8 of the 1977 season. He wore the number 20 during his tenure at the Cats, and was awarded the Carji Greeves Medal in 1983.

Card was captain coach of the Wangaratta Football Club in the Ovens and Murray Football League from 1988 to 1990, then was assistant playing coach with Milawa Football Club when they won the 1991 Ovens & King Football League premiership (and Card also won the club best and fairest award). He then coached Milawa in 1992.

Card then coached the Ovens and Murray Football League interleague side in 1993, then returned to Wangaratta from 1994 to 1996 as their non-playing coach.

== Personal life ==
Card is the son of former Geelong player, George Card.

In August 2025, he was found guilty and sentenced to a minimum of four years in jail for causing a fatal car crash in November 2024 on the Geelong Ring Road at Lara, which led to the death of his wife, Mandy and serious injury to another driver.
