= Luke Norman =

Australian rules footballer

Personal information
- Full name: Luke Thomas Norman
- Born: 16 December 1971 (age 54)
- Original team: Wangaratta
- Draft: No. 68, 1994 National Draft
- Height: 184 cm (6 ft 0 in)
- Weight: 85 kg (187 lb)
- Position: Defender

Playing career^{1}
Years	Club	Games (Goals)
1995–1996	Melbourne	16 (3)

Coaching career
Years	Club	Games (W–L–D)
2009–2011	Sturt	65 (32–32–1)
- ^{1} Playing statistics correct to the end of 2011.

Luke Thomas Norman (born 16 December 1971) is a former Australian rules footballer who played with Melbourne in the Australian Football League (AFL).

Norman was originally from Wangaratta and was selected by Melbourne with pick 68 in the 1994 National Draft. A defender, he made nine appearances in the 1995 AFL season and another seven in the 1996 season.

In 2004, Norman was appointed captain of West Adelaide in the South Australian National Football League and won their best and fairest award that year. He also captained the club in 2005.

He coached the Sturt reserves to a premiership in 2008 and took over as senior coach the following season. In his first year as coach he steered Sturt into the SANFL grand final, which they lost to Central District. He remained with the club for two more seasons.
