= Arthur Mills (Australian footballer) =

Australian rules footballer, born 1905

Personal information
- Full name: Arthur William Mills
- Born: 22 November 1905; Jeparit, Victoria
- Died: 9 March 1984 (aged 78); Wangaratta, Victoria
- Original teams: Bethanga, Wangaratta

Playing career^{1}
Years	Club	Games (Goals)
1930	Hawthorn	10 (1)
- ^{1} Playing statistics correct to the end of 1930.

Arthur William Mills (22 November 1905 – 9 March 1984) was an Australian rules footballer who played for the Hawthorn Football Club in the Victorian Football League (VFL).

Local brothers, Arthur Mills and Albert Mills played for Bethanga in the 1926 and 1927 Kiewa & District Football Association grand finals, before the family moved to Oxley, near Wangaratta, playing with Wangaratta Football Club in 1929, then both brothers made their debuts for the Hawthorn Football Club in 1930.

Mills won the 1934 - Ovens & King Football League best and fairest award, the Charles Butler Medal when playing for the Waratahs Football Club.

Mills coached the Waratahs FC to the 1935 O&KFL premiership

Mills played in the 1940 O&KFL premiership with the Milawa Football Club.

He was the older brother of Bert Mills.
