= Joe Richards =

Australian rules footballer

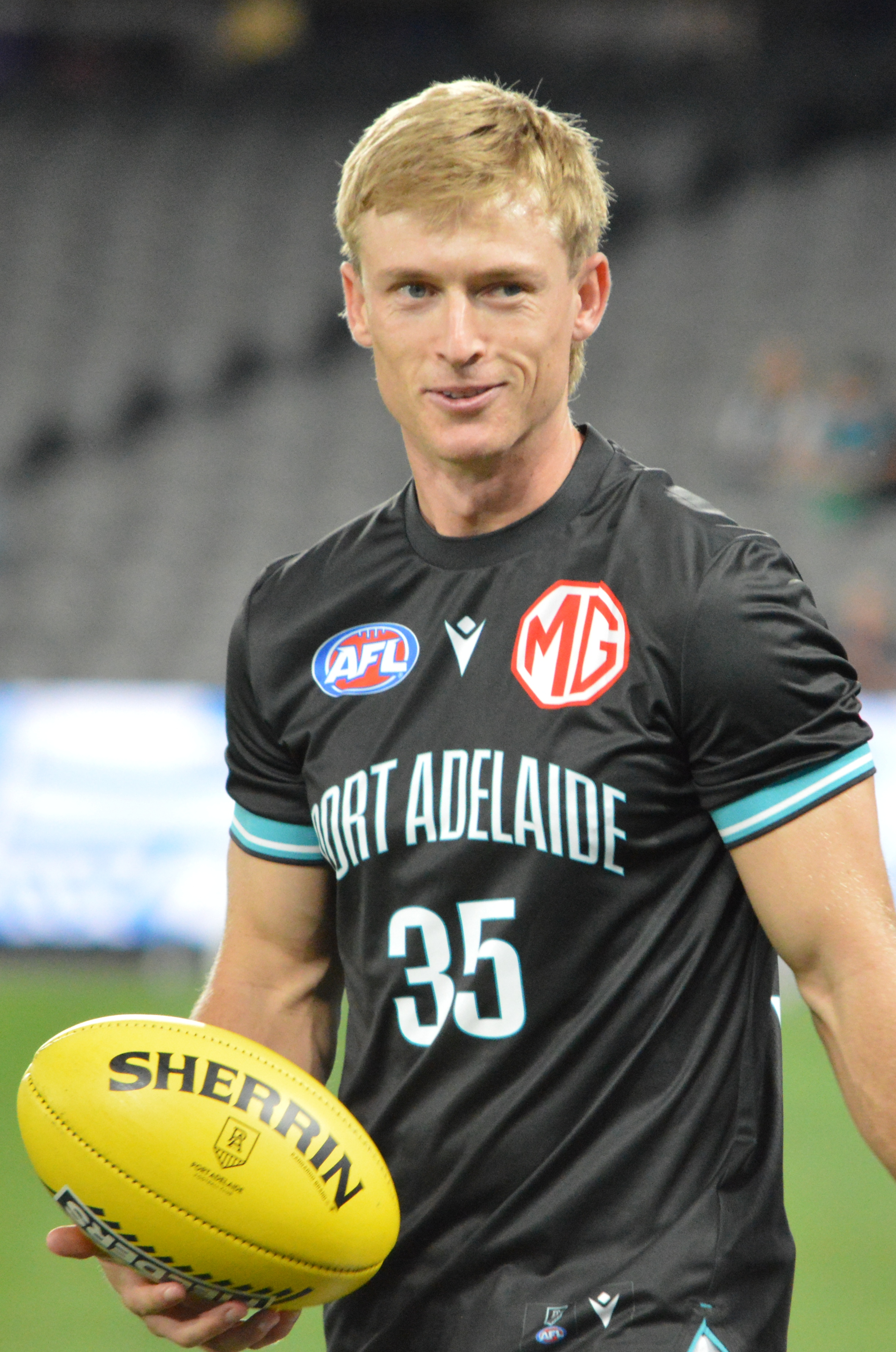
- Richards with Port Adelaide in March 2026

Personal information
- Full name: Joe Richards
- Born: 23 November 1999 (age 26)
- Original teams: Wangaratta, Murray Bushrangers, (NAB League)
- Draft: No. 48, 2022 national draft
- Debut: 12 May 2024, Collingwood vs. West Coast, at Marvel Stadium
- Height: 177 cm (5 ft 10 in)
- Weight: 71 kg (157 lb)
- Position: Forward

Club information
- Current club: Port Adelaide
- Number: 35

Playing career^{1}
Years	Club	Games (Goals)
2023–2024	Collingwood	9 (6)
2025–	Port Adelaide	40 (24)
Total		49 (30)
- ^{1} Playing statistics correct to the end of round 22, 2026.

Joe Richards (born 23 November 1999) is a professional Australian rules footballer playing for the Port Adelaide Football Club in the Australian Football League (AFL). Richards plays as a small forward.

== AFL career ==
Richards was drafted by Collingwood with pick 48 as a mature-age player during the 2022 AFL national draft. Unlike the majority of drafted players, Richards did not play in the major state based leagues after his under age career, but was drafted direct from Wangaratta in the Ovens & Murray Football Netball League where he won their club best and fairest in 2018, 2019 and 2022 and played in their 2022 Ovens & Murray Football Netball League grand final win.

Richards made his AFL debut in Round 9 of the 2024 season, having 18 disposals and kicking 1 goal in a 66 point win over West Coast.

After his debut season, Richards requested a trade to Port Adelaide to take up a three-year deal on offer from the Power, and was traded on 15 October.

== Statistics ==
Updated to the end of round 22, 2026.

Legend
G	Goals	K	Kicks	D	Disposals	T	Tackles
B	Behinds	H	Handballs	M	Marks

Season	Team	No.	Games	Totals							Averages (per game)							Votes
Season	Team	No.	Games	G	B	K	H	D	M	T	G	B	K	H	D	M	T	Votes
2023	Collingwood	29	0	—	—	—	—	—	—	—	—	—	—	—	—	—	—	0
2024	Collingwood	29	9	6	5	59	44	103	20	25	0.7	0.6	6.6	4.9	11.4	2.2	2.8	0
2025	Port Adelaide	35	22	15	15	170	165	335	74	71	0.7	0.7	7.7	7.5	15.2	3.4	3.2	0
2026	Port Adelaide	35	18	9	11	195	124	319	75	82	0.5	0.6	10.8	6.9	17.7	4.2	4.6	0
Career			49	30	31	424	333	757	169	178	0.6	0.6	8.7	6.8	15.4	3.4	3.6	0
