= Ian Rowland (footballer) =

Australian rules footballer

Personal information
- Born: 4 March 1941 (age 85)
- Original team: Wangaratta
- Height: 173 cm (5 ft 8 in)
- Weight: 75 kg (165 lb)

Playing career^{1}
Years	Club	Games (Goals)
1960–1966	St Kilda	109 (97)
- ^{1} Playing statistics correct to the end of 1966.

Career highlights
- St Kilda leading goalkicker - 1961

Ian Rowland (born 4 March 1941) is a former Australian rules footballer who played for the St Kilda Football Club in the Victorian Football League (VFL).

Rowland played for the Saints from 1960 until 1966 and was St Kilda Football Club's leading goalkicker in 1961.

He played in St Kilda's 1965 Grand Final side which was defeated by 35 points, but was dropped for their victory in 1966, despite playing 18 games during the year, including the previous week.

Rowland coached Finley Football Club in the Murray Football League from 1967 to 1970, then played with North Albury Football Club in 1971, before retiring.
