= Tom Tribe =

Australian rules footballer, born 1919

Personal information
- Full name: Tom Tribe
- Born: 4 February 1919
- Died: 23 December 1991 (aged 72)
- Original team: Yarraville
- Height: 178 cm (5 ft 10 in)
- Weight: 79 kg (174 lb)
- Position: Defence

Playing career^{1}
Years	Club	Games (Goals)
1939–46	Footscray	101 (5)
- ^{1} Playing statistics correct to the end of 1946.

Tom Tribe (4 February 1919 – 23 December 1991) was a former Australian rules footballer who played with Footscray in the Victorian Football League (VFL).

Originally from Victorian Football Association (VFA) club Yarraville, Tribe was recruited by Footscray for the 1939 VFL season and played 101 games until his retirement in 1946.

Tribe was captain-coach of Wangaratta in 1947 and 1948.

Brother of Test cricketer and VFL footballer, George Tribe.
