= Clarrie Morelli =

Australian rules footballer (1906–1997)

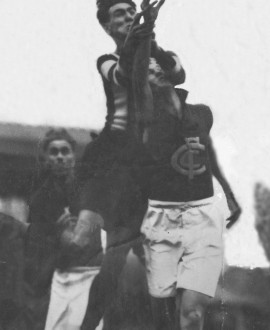
- Morelli in 1927

Personal information
- Full name: Clarence Alexander Morelli
- Born: 6 October 1906; Bethanga, Victoria
- Died: 19 May 1997 (aged 90)
- Original team: Preston
- Height: 180 cm (5 ft 11 in)
- Weight: 67 kg (148 lb)

Playing career^{1}
Years	Club	Games (Goals)
1927	Collingwood	7 (1)
- ^{1} Playing statistics correct to the end of 1927.

Clarrie "Dido" Morelli (6 October 1906 – 19 May 1997), whose paternal grandfather was Italian-born, was an Australian rules footballer who played with Collingwood in the Victorian Football League (VFL).

Morelli made the final list at Collingwood in 1926 but played out the season with the Fairfield Football Club

Morelli played seven senior VFL games in 1927, debuting against Richmond in round three, and played in the Collingwood reserves in 1928.

Morelli played with Fairfield in the Victorian Sub Districts Football League in 1929. In the drawn grand final against Kew, Morelli was best on the ground. Fairfield lost the grand final replay to Kew by 32 points, but Morelli was Fairfield's second best player and kicked one goal

In June 1930, Morelli moved to Wodonga due to his work with the Victorian Railways, and coached and played with the Weir United Football Club in 1930, winning the Ovens & Murray Football League premiership. He kicked 14 goals against Benalla in August 1930.

Morelli was vice-captain of the Ouyen Rovers Football Club when they won the Ouyen District Football Association premiership in 1931.

== Notes ==
b
