= Jonathon McCormick =

Australian rules footballer (born 1981)

Personal information
- Full name: Jonathon McCormick
- Nickname: Hoppa
- Born: 26 March 1981 (age 45); Wangaratta
- Original teams: Wangaratta; Murray Kangaroos; Murray Bushrangers
- Draft: 1st overall, 2003 Rookie draft
- Height: 181 cm (5 ft 11 in)
- Weight: 70 kg (154 lb)
- Position: Midfielder

Playing career^{1}
Years	Club	Games (Goals)
2003–04	Carlton	26 (5)
- ^{1} Playing statistics correct to the end of 2002.

Jonathon "Jon" McCormick (born 26 March 1981) is a former Australian rules footballer who played with Carlton in the Australian Football League (AFL). After being delisted by the Blues at the end of 2004, McCormick returned to his former team, Wangaratta, to play in the Ovens & Murray Football League. McCormick won the Morris Medal, awarded to the Ovens & Murray Football League's best and fairest player, in 2006 and also won back-to-back premierships with Wangaratta in 2007 and 2008, before suffering a knee injury in 2009 that forced him to take a five-year break from the game. On 26 July 2014 he resumed his career with Tarrawingee in the Ovens & King Football League.

== Sources ==
- Holmesby, Russell & Main, Jim (2009). The Encyclopedia of AFL Footballers. 8th ed. Melbourne: Bas Publishing.
- Jonathon McCormick's playing statistics from AFL Tables
