= Norm Le Brun =

Australian rules footballer

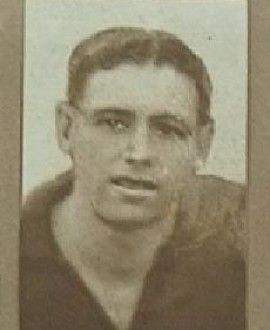
- Le Brun in 1934

Personal information
- Full name: Norman Stanley Le Brun
- Born: 22 April 1908; Richmond, Victoria
- Died: 15 November 1944 (aged 36); Aitape, New Guinea
- Original team: Richmond Seconds
- Height: 171 cm (5 ft 7 in)
- Weight: 76 kg (168 lb)

Playing career^{1}
| Years | Club | Games (Goals) |
| 1929 | South Melbourne (VFL) | 3 (2) |
| 1930 | Sandhurst (BFL) | |
| 1931–1932 | Essendon (VFL) | 23 (4) |
| 1933–1934 | Collingwood (VFL) | 19 (23) |
| 1935 | Carlton (VFL) | 5 (2) |
| Total | | 50 (31) |
- ^{1} Playing statistics correct to the end of 1935.

Norman Stanley Le Brun (22 April 1908 – 15 November 1944) was an Australian rules footballer who played with South Melbourne, Essendon, Collingwood and Carlton in the Victorian Football League (VFL). He was one of the few players to play with four different VFL clubs.

== Family ==
The son of Francis Thomas Willimet Le Brun (1876–1952), and Mary Jane Le Brun (1875–1955), née West, Norman Stanley Le Brun was born in Richmond, Victoria on 22 April 1908.

== Football ==
=== South Melbourne (VFL) ===
Granted a clearance from Richmond, he played 3 senior games for South Melbourne in 1929.

=== Sandhurst (BFL) ===
Cleared from South Melbourne in April 1930 to Sandhurst Football Club in the Bendigo Football League, Le Brun won the inaugural Bendigo Football League best and fairest award, the Fred Wood Medal in 1930.

=== Essendon (VFL) ===
Cleared from Sandhurst to Essendon Football Club in May 1931,

=== Collingwood (VFL) ===
Cleared from Essendon to Collingwood Football Club in April 1933, he played 19 senior games over two seasons (1933–1934).

=== Carlton (VFL) ===
Cleared from Collingwood to Carlton in April 1935, he played in five senior matches.

=== Griffith Football Club (LDFA) ===
In 1936 he was appointed captain-coach of the Griffith Football Club in the Leeton District Football Association.

=== South Warrnambool (HFL) ===
In 1937 he was appointed captain-coach of the South Warrnambool Football Club in the Hampden Football League.

=== Wangaratta (OMFA) ===
In 1938 he was appointed as playing-coach of the Wangaratta Football Club in the Ovens & Murray Football Association. Having coached the side to the Association's premiership in 1938, he was re-appointed in 1939.

=== Ganmain (SWDFL) ===
In 1940 he was appointed as playing-coach of the Ganmain Football Club in the South West District Football League and coached them to a premiership.

== Military service ==
Employed as a bricklayer at the time, he enlisted as a commando in the Second AIF on 26 February 1942, a week after the Bombing of Darwin.

He was killed in action, when shot by a Japanese sniper, on 15 November 1944, in New Guinea during the Aitape–Wewak campaign.

… In the Aitape sector, too, is the Le Brun Feature, a steep hill on the Danmap River, and known now simply as Le Brun.
It is named after the first Australian killed in the area, Norman Le Brun, trooper in a cavalry commando squadron, and former well-known Victorian footballer. The Herald, 5 May 1945.

He is buried at the Lae War Cemetery.

== See also ==
- List of Victorian Football League players who died on active service
