= Joe Berry (Australian footballer) =

Australian rules footballer

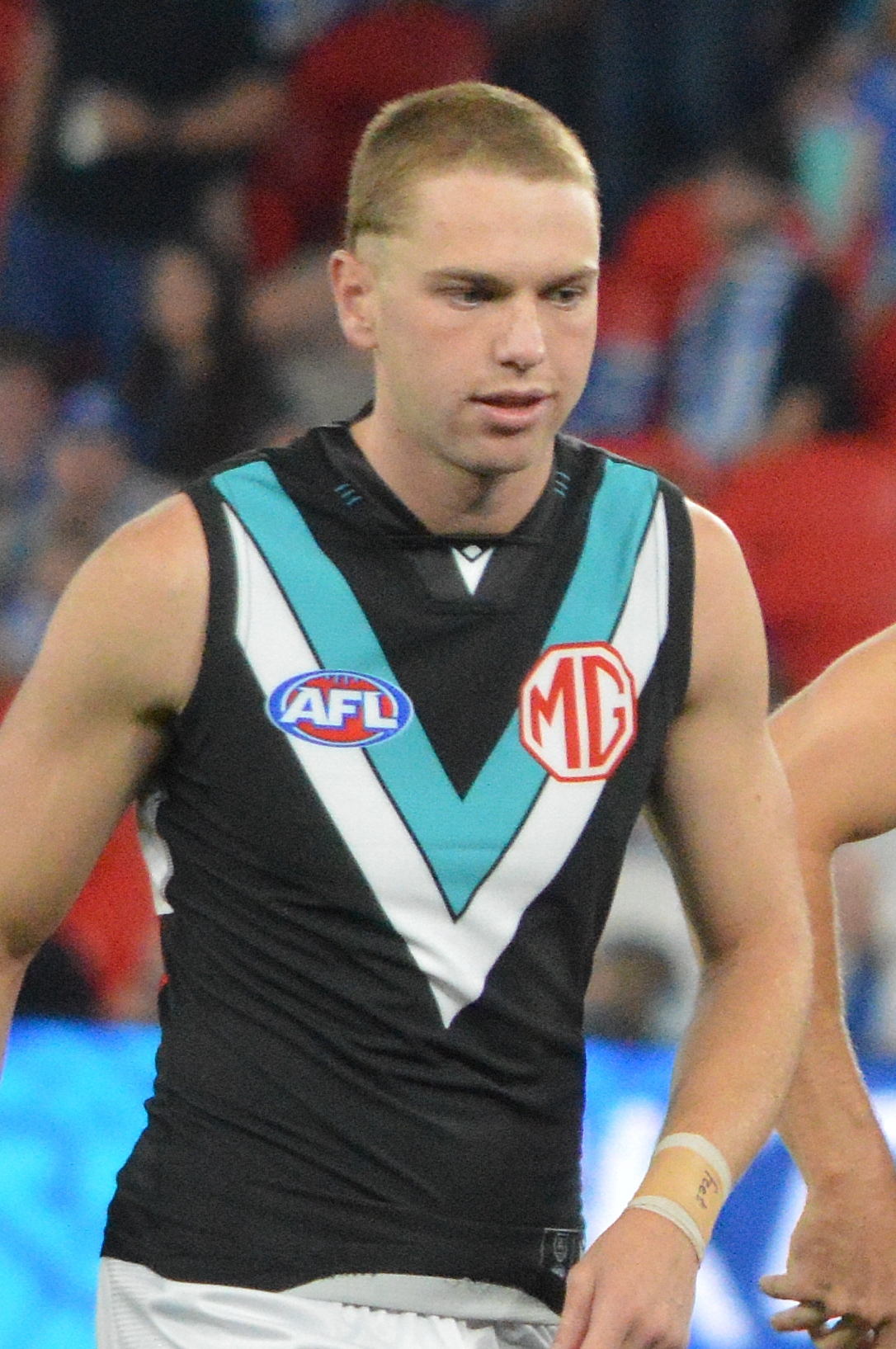
- Berry in March 2026

Personal information
- Full name: Joe Berry
- Born: 18 April 2006 (age 20)
- Original teams: Murray Bushrangers (Talent League); Wangaratta
- Draft: No. 15, 2024 national draft
- Debut: 15 March 2025, Port Adelaide vs. Collingwood, at MCG
- Height: 180 cm (5 ft 11 in)
- Position: Forward

Club information
- Current club: Port Adelaide
- Number: 5

Playing career^{1}
Years	Club	Games (Goals)
2025–	Port Adelaide	31 (17)
- ^{1} Playing statistics correct to the end of round 22, 2026.

Joe Berry (born 18 April 2006) is a professional Australian rules footballer playing for the Port Adelaide Football Club in the Australian Football League (AFL).

Originally from Wangaratta, Berry plays as a small forward.

== Early Life and Junior Career ==
Prior to being drafted, Berry played for the Wangaratta Magpies in the Ovens & Murray Football Netball League (OMFNL), sharing the same junior club as future Port Adelaide teammate Joe Richards.

He played for the Murray Bushrangers in the Talent League, earning selection to represent Victoria Country at the 2024 AFL National Championships. Representing Vic Country, he kicked 9 goals in 4 matches and was selected in the under-18 All Australian team of 2024. He tied for 1st in the Bushrangers best-and-fairest award in 2024.

== AFL career ==
Berry made his debut in round 1 of the 2025 AFL Season, and went on to play a total of 12 senior AFL games for the year.

== Playing Style ==
A small forward, Berry is noted for his accurate shot at goal, speed and roving ability around packs. He has cited Robbie Gray as the main player he modeled his game style off.

== Statistics ==
Updated to the end of round 22, 2026.

Legend
G	Goals	K	Kicks	D	Disposals	T	Tackles
B	Behinds	H	Handballs	M	Marks

Season	Team	No.	Games	Totals							Averages (per game)							Votes
Season	Team	No.	Games	G	B	K	H	D	M	T	G	B	K	H	D	M	T	Votes
2025	Port Adelaide	5	12	3	4	64	44	108	29	23	0.3	0.3	5.3	3.7	9.0	2.4	1.9	0
2026	Port Adelaide	5	21	14	13	154	120	274	68	33	0.7	0.6	7.3	5.7	13.0	3.2	1.6	0
Career			33	17	17	218	164	382	97	56	0.5	0.5	6.6	5.0	11.6	2.9	1.7	0
