= Alex Fraser (Australian footballer) =

Australian rules footballer

Personal information
- Full name: Alex Fraser
- Born: 25 December 1908
- Died: 13 September 1983 (aged 74)
- Original teams: East Albury, Wangaratta
- Height: 175 cm (5 ft 9 in)
- Weight: 73 kg (161 lb)

Playing career^{1}
Years	Club	Games (Goals)
1931	St Kilda	3 (0)
- ^{1} Playing statistics correct to the end of 1931.

Alex Fraser (25 December 1908 – 13 September 1983) was an Australian rules footballer who played for the St Kilda Football Club in the Victorian Football League (VFL).

A G Fraser was granted a permit by the VFL from East Albury FC to St Kilda in June 1931.

Fraser played his first senior against Collingwood at Victoria Park, Melbourne in round six 1931 and "was one of the best on the side".

Fraser returned to Wangaratta and played many more years of Ovens & Murray Football League with Wangaratta.
