= Peter Hughes (footballer) =

Australian rules footballer (1934–2020)

Personal information
- Full name: Peter Hughes
- Born: 17 June 1934
- Died: 27 November 2020 (aged 86); Parkinson, Queensland
- Original team: Wangaratta
- Height: 183 cm (6 ft 0 in)
- Weight: 80 kg (176 lb)

Playing career^{1}
Years	Club	Games (Goals)
1953–54	Hawthorn	16 (1)
- ^{1} Playing statistics correct to the end of 1954.

Peter Hughes (17 June 1934 – 27 November 2020) was an Australian rules footballer who played with Hawthorn in the Victorian Football League (VFL) recruited from Wangaratta and signed by Hawthorn in September 1951 as a seventeen year old.

Hughes was jointly awarded best first year player together with Alf Hughes (no relation) in his first year playing with Hawthorn in 1953.

Hughes captained the Wangaratta South Wanderers to a premiership in 1950 in the Wangaratta Junior Football League. In 1951 he was a member of the Wangaratta second eighteen that won the premiership of the Benalla-Tungamah League by 23 goals. in 1952 while studying Civil Engineering at Swinburne Technical College he played with the Wangaratta and won an Ovens and Murray Football League premiership that year defeating Rutherglen in the Grand Final.

In 1955 Hughes was appointed to the Shire of Oxley as Assistant Borough Engineer of Wangaratta and he played football with the Wangaratta Football Club team and in 1957 coached Whorouly Football Club in the Ovens and King Football League.

He died at 2:39 pm on Friday 27 November 2020 at the Bolton Clarke Carrington Retirement Community in Brisbane.
