= Percy Jones (footballer) =

Australian rules footballer (1908–1960)

Personal information
- Full name: Percy Alan Jones
- Born: 20 January 1908; Wangaratta, Victoria
- Died: 14 March 1960 (aged 52)
- Original teams: Wangaratta, Hume Weir (O&MFL)
- Position: Full forward

Playing career^{1}
Years	Club	Games (Goals)
1929	Geelong	2 (3)
- ^{1} Playing statistics correct to the end of 1929.

Percy Alan Jones (20 January 1908 – 14 March 1960) was an Australian rules footballer who played with Geelong in the Victorian Football League (VFL).

Originally from Wangaratta, Jones played in Wangaratta's 1925 Ovens & Murray Football League premiership under coach, Percy Rowe.

Jones crossed to the Hume Weir Football Club in 1926 (most likely for work during the construction of the Hume Weir), then was recruited to Geelong via Hume Weir Football Club in the Ovens & Murray Football League, after kicking 104 goals in 1928

Jones commenced training with Geelong in March, 1929 and made his senior VFL debut in June, 1929, in round eight, against Hawthorn, kicking two goals, then played again in round nine, against South Melbourne, kicking 1 goal.

Jones kicked four goals in Weir United's 1931 Ovens & Murray Football League grand final win against West Albury.

Jones kicked four goals for Border United FC (Albury) in their 1933 Ovens & Murray Football League one point grand final loss to Wangaratta, after earlier kicking 11 goals against Rutherglen in round nine. Jones finished with 60 goals in 1933.

== Family ==
The son of Rowland Herbert Jones, and Maud Lucy Jones, née Vincent, Percy Alan Jones was born at Wangaratta, Victoria on 20 January 1908.
