= Mick Pavone =

Australian rules footballer

Personal information
- Full name: Mick Pavone
- Born: 6 October 1951 (age 75)
- Original team: Assumption College
- Height: 185 cm (6 ft 1 in)
- Weight: 80 kg (176 lb)

Playing career^{1}
Years	Club	Games (Goals)
1970–71	South Melbourne	10 (9)
- ^{1} Playing statistics correct to the end of 1971.

Mick Pavone (born 6 October 1951) is a former Australian rules footballer who played with South Melbourne in the Victorian Football League (VFL). Mick was the 8,240th player to appear in the AFL and the 975th player to appear for South Melbourne.

Pavone kicked over 100 goals for Assumption College in 1969.

Pavone played with the Wangaratta Football Club in the Ovens & Murray Football League in 1974 and 1975 and won their 1974 goal kicking with 60 goals.
