= Ron McDonald =

Australian rules footballer

Personal information
- Full name: Ron McDonald
- Born: 12 August 1933
- Died: 11 September 2000 (aged 67)
- Original team: Murtoa
- Height: 189 cm (6 ft 2 in)
- Weight: 83 kg (183 lb)

Playing career^{1}
Years	Club	Games (Goals)
1955–60	Richmond	92 (84)
- ^{1} Playing statistics correct to the end of 1960.

Ron McDonald (12 August 1933 – 11 September 2000) was an Australian rules footballer who played for Richmond in the Victorian Football League (VFL).

A strong marking key position player from Murtoa, McDonald was a consistent performer in six seasons at Richmond. He started out strongly with two goals on debut and after going goal-less the following week, kicked four successive hauls of four goals. When not at centre half forward, he was used either as a ruckman or centre half back. He represented the VFL at the 1958 Melbourne Carnival and was Richmond's joint top vote getter in the 1959 Brownlow Medal count.

McDonald transferred to Wangaratta with his work in the bank and played with Wangaratta from 1961 to 1963, winning their goal kicking in 1961 and 1962. McDonald played centre half forward, kicking five goals against Benalla in their 1961 Ovens & Murray Football League premiership.
