= Reg Baker =

Australian rules footballer

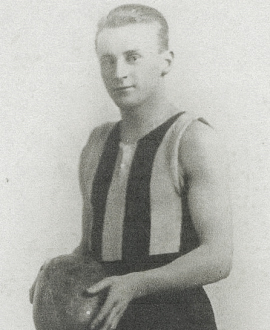
- Baker during his Collingwood career

Personal information
- Full name: Arthur Reginald Baker
- Born: 18 September 1899
- Died: 1 September 1977 (aged 77)
- Original team: Wonthaggi
- Height: 163 cm (5 ft 4 in)
- Weight: 60 kg (132 lb)
- Positions: Rover, forward

Playing career^{1}
Years	Club	Games (Goals)
1922–1928	Collingwood	60 (60)
1928	Richmond	10 (7)
Total		70 (67)
- ^{1} Playing statistics correct to the end of 1928.

Arthur Reginald Baker (18 September 1899 – 1 September 1977) was an Australian rules footballer who played with Collingwood and Richmond in the Victorian Football League (VFL).

== VFL career ==
One of three brothers to play in the VFL (along with Selwyn and Ted), Baker played his football as a rover and in the forward line. Baker was a losing grand finalist for Collingwood in both 1925 and 1926. He finished equal fifth in the 1926 Brownlow Medal.

In 1927, Baker returned to Wonthaggi FC and was captain-coach of their Central Gippsland Football League.

Baker returned to Collingwood in 1928 and during the 1928 VFL season, Baker crossed to Richmond, where he made 10 appearances.

== Coaching ==
Baker coached his original club Wonthaggi for five years and steered them to three premierships in 1927, 1929 and ? He won a further three premierships as coach of Leongatha in 1931, 1934 and 1935. Baker also spent time as coach of Wonthaggi (1941) Morwell (1947 & 1948) and Yallourn (1951).
