= Vin Doolan =

Australian rules footballer

Personal information
- Full name: Vin Doolan
- Born: 20 August 1952 (age 74)
- Original teams: Chiltern, Wodonga
- Height: 175 cm (5 ft 9 in)
- Weight: 77 kg (170 lb)

Playing career^{1}
Years	Club	Games (Goals)
1971–1974	North Melbourne	45 (30)
- ^{1} Playing statistics correct to the end of 1974.

Vin Doolan (born 20 August 1952) is a former Australian rules footballer who played with North Melbourne in the Victorian Football League (VFL).

Doolan came to North Melbourne from the Wodonga Football Club in the Ovens & Murray Football League where he won the club best and fairest in 1970.

He shared North Melbourne's goal-kicking award with Sam Kekovich in 1972, despite kicking only 19 goals. It was the lowest tally to top the club's goal-kicking since 1937.

Doolan was captain-coach of Rutherglen in the Ovens & Murray Football League from 1975 to 1978 and was captain coach of Wangaratta from 1979 to 1981.

Doolan was captain/coach of Rutherglen / Corowa FC in the Coreen & District Football League from 1983 to 1986. Premiers in 1984 and 1986.

Doolan was inducted into the Ovens & Murray Football League Hall of Fame in 2026.
