= Len Cottrell =

Australian rules footballer

Personal information
- Full name: Len Cottrell
- Born: 27 January 1936 (age 90)
- Original teams: Bethanga, Myrtleford
- Height: 185 cm (6 ft 1 in)
- Weight: 82.5 kg (182 lb)

Playing career^{1}
Years	Club	Games (Goals)
1958–59	Carlton	12 (2)
- ^{1} Playing statistics correct to the end of 1959.

Len Cottrell (born 27 January 1936) is a former Australian rules footballer who played with Carlton in the Victorian Football League (VFL).

Cottrell played with Bethanga in the Tallangatta & District Football League from 1953 to 1955, then played football with Tawonga Football Club in 1956, then with Myrtleford in 1957.
