= Ian Nicoll =

Australian rules footballer

Personal information
- Full name: Ian Nicoll
- Born: 2 October 1946 (age 80)
- Original teams: Whorouly, Wangaratta
- Height: 179 cm (5 ft 10 in)
- Weight: 73 kg (161 lb)
- Position: Rover

Playing career^{1}
Years	Club	Games (Goals)
1967–1970	Carlton	41 (30)
- ^{1} Playing statistics correct to the end of 1970.

Ian Nicoll (born 2 October 1946) is a former Australian rules footballer who played with Carlton in the Victorian Football League (VFL) during the late 1960s.

A left footer, Nicoll played with Whorouly in the Ovens and King Football League, then joined Wangaratta in the Ovens and Murray Football League for one season in 1966, before joining Carlton and served them mainly as a rover / forward pocket. He played in Carlton's 1969 VFL Grand Final side which lost to Richmond.

Ian and his cousin Lex hold the all time A. Grade - record batting partnership (5th wicket) in the Wangaratta & District Cricket Association of 302 when playing for the Whorouly Cricket Club in 1964/65. Ian made 205 and Lex Nicoll made 103 not out
