= Bert Carey =

Australian rules footballer, born 1905

Personal information
- Full name: Herbert Wesley Carey
- Born: 30 May 1905; Stawell, Victoria
- Died: 10 July 1994 (aged 89)
- Original teams: Euroa, Wangaratta
- Height: 178 cm (5 ft 10 in)
- Weight: 75 kg (165 lb)

Playing career^{1}
Years	Club	Games (Goals)
1926	Fitzroy	5 (5)
1933, 1937	Hawthorn	10 (16)
Total		15 (21)
- ^{1} Playing statistics correct to the end of 1937.

Herbert Wesley Carey (30 May 1905 – 10 July 1994) was an Australian rules footballer who played for the Fitzroy Football Club and Hawthorn Football Club in the Victorian Football League (VFL).
