= Geoff Rosenow =

Australian rules footballer

Personal information
- Full name: Geoffrey Mervyn Rosenow
- Born: 1 February 1942
- Died: 25 March 1999 (aged 57); Golden Square, Victoria
- Original team: Echuca
- Height: 188 cm (6 ft 2 in)
- Weight: 87 kg (192 lb)

Playing career^{1}
Years	Club	Games (Goals)
1962–1970	Geelong	147 (7)
1971–1974	Wangaratta	? (17)
1975-1978	Mordialloc	21 (5)
Total		178 (29)
- ^{1} Playing statistics correct to the end of 1970.

Geoffrey Mervyn "Tex" Rosenow (1 February 1942 – 25 March 1999) was an Australian rules footballer who played with Geelong in the Victorian Football League (VFL) during the 1960s.

Rosenow missed out on playing in Geelong's 1963 premiership team despite appearing in most of their home and away fixtures but played in their losing 1967 Grand Final. He became a regular member of the side towards the end of his career and from 1965 until late in the 1970 VFL season Rosenow played exactly 100 consecutive games. He ran out as Geelong captain versus Fitzroy in the first match at Waverley Park in 1970 as it was his 100th game.

Rosenow was used mostly as a ruckman and defender. He was a strong marker of the ball and did not shy away from physical confrontation, as demonstrated by a famous incident in 1964. The incident occurred in a game against North Melbourne at Kardinia Park when he allegedly 'king-hit' North Melbourne coach Alan Killigrew in the players race which caused a brawl. No charges were laid against him.

After leaving Geelong Rosenow became playing coach of the Wangaratta Football Club from 1971 to 1974 and won their best and fairest award in 1973 and was runner up in the 1973 Ovens & Murray Football League best and fairest award, the Morris Medal.

He joined Victorian Football Association (VFA) club Mordialloc in 1975 as captain-coach, steering them to the second division premiership two years later. He served in that role from 1975 until 1978.

In 1979, Rosenow was appointed playing coach of GVFL club Rochester. In 1980 he took the team to its first GVFL finals campaign where it was dismissed in "straight sets". He continued coaching Rochester until 1982.

Rosenow returned to Mordialloc as coach from 1983 until 1984. In 1984, Rosenow coached the VFA Division 2 team in a win against the SAFA. He was named captain of the Mordialloc Team of the Century and positioned in the back pocket.

Rosenow returned to Rochester in 1987, and the team played finals in 1988 but was again knocked out in straight sets.

A police officer, Rosenow died in 1999 and was posthumously inducted into the Victoria Police sporting hall of fame.
