= Harry Skreja =

Australian rules footballer

Personal information
- Full name: Harry Martin Skreja
- Born: 13 February 1953 (age 73)
- Original team: Toora
- Height: 183 cm (6 ft 0 in)
- Weight: 81 kg (179 lb)

Playing career^{1}
Years	Club	Games (Goals)
1969–71	Footscray	18 (13)
- ^{1} Playing statistics correct to the end of 1971.

Harry Martin Skreja (born 13 February 1953) is a former Australian rules footballer who played with Footscray in the Victorian Football League (VFL).

Skreja made his VFL debut in 1969, in round seven against South Melbourne, as a 16 year old.

Skreja was captain / coach of the Wangaratta Football Club in 1975 and kicked 95 goals in the Ovens & Murray Football League.

In 1977, Skreja, was captain / coach of Yarram in the Alberton Football League, which won the 1977 premiership, kicking 113 goals for the season too.

Skreja was captain / coach of Leeton in 1979 and also represented the South West Football League (New South Wales).
