= Damian Lang =

Australian rules footballer

Personal information
- Born: 3 March 1976 (age 50)
- Original team: Leeton
- Height: 191 cm (6 ft 3 in)
- Weight: 78 kg (172 lb)

Playing career^{1}
Years	Club	Games (Goals)
1994	Sydney Swans	5 (4)
1998	Carlton	3 (1)
Total		8 (5)
- ^{1} Playing statistics correct to the end of 1998.

Damian Lang (born 3 March 1976) is a former Australian rules footballer who played with Sydney and Carlton in the Australian Football League (AFL). Between his seasons with Sydney and Carlton, Lang played for Port Adelaide in the South Australian National Football League.

Lang played at Wangaratta Football Club in the Ovens & Murray Football League from 2002 to 2005 and kicked 262 goals and was the leading O&MFNL goalkicker in 2003 and 2004.
