= Bob Constable =

Australian rules footballer

Personal information
- Full name: Robert James Constable
- Born: 14 April 1932
- Died: 22 June 2004 (aged 72)
- Original team: Murtoa
- Height: 180 cm (5 ft 11 in)
- Weight: 75 kg (165 lb)
- Position: half back flank

Playing career^{1}
| Years | Club | Games (Goals) |
| 1953 | Melbourne | 3 (1) |
- ^{1} Playing statistics correct to the end of 1953.

Robert James Constable (14 April 1932 – 22 June 2004) was an Australian rules footballer who played with Melbourne in the Victorian Football League (VFL).
