= Des Steele =

Australian rules footballer

Personal information
- Full name: Des Steele
- Born: 27 November 1943; Wangaratta
- Original team: Xavier College
- Height: 185 cm (6 ft 1 in)
- Weight: 79 kg (174 lb)

Playing career^{1}
Years	Club	Games (Goals)
1962–63	Collingwood	8 (0)
- ^{1} Playing statistics correct to the end of 1963.

Des Steele is a former Australian rules footballer who played with Collingwood in the Victorian Football League (VFL).
