= Clarrie Nolan =

Australian rules footballer (1904–1998)

Personal information
- Full name: Clarence Joseph Nolan
- Born: 24 August 1904; Wangaratta, Victoria
- Died: 18 January 1998 (aged 93)
- Original teams: Glenrowan, Benalla, Shepparton
- Height: 187 cm (6 ft 2 in)
- Weight: 80 kg (176 lb)

Playing career^{1}
Years	Club	Games (Goals)
1925–1928	North Melbourne	44 (31)
- ^{1} Playing statistics correct to the end of 1928.

Clarence Joseph Nolan (24 August 1904 – 18 January 1998) was an Australian rules footballer who played with North Melbourne in the Victorian Football League (VFL).

Nolan, was a Benalla and Shepparton recruit, who joined North Melbourne in 1925 and took part in their inaugural VFL season.

He was North Melbourne's leading goal-kicker in 1928 with 24 goals, despite not registering his first goal until round nine.

In 1928, Nolan won the Sporting Globe newspaper competition for the longest place kick, with a kick of 71 yards, 2 foot & 4 inches.

In 1929, Nolan joined West Albury as captain-coach and kicked seven goals in their Ovens and Murray Football League grand final win against East Albury Football Club.

In June 1930, Nolan stepped aside as captain / coach of West Albury to allow Haydn Bunton to take over as captain / coach on his return to West Albury from Fitzroy Football Club.

Nolan played in four consecutive O&MFL grand finals with West Albury between 1929 and 1932.

Nolan stood for the Australian Labor Party for the seat of Hume in the 1940 Federal Election, which was retained very narrowly from Nolan by Thomas Collins.

Nolan was a co-founder of the Nolan Brothers Sports Stores, located in Albury, Leeton and Wangaratta for many years.

Clarrie was the older brother of Melbourne footballer, Leo Nolan.
