= Allan Skehan =

Australian rules footballer, born 1906

Personal information
- Full name: William Allan Skehan
- Born: 1 January 1906; Moyhu, Victoria
- Died: 20 April 2004 (aged 98); Wangaratta, Victoria
- Original team: Wangaratta
- Height: 187 cm (6 ft 2 in)
- Weight: 79 kg (174 lb)

Playing career^{1}
Years	Club	Games (Goals)
1927–1929	Carlton	13 (6)
- ^{1} Playing statistics correct to the end of 1929.

William Allan Skehan (1 January 1906 – 20 April 2004) was an Australian rules footballer who played for the Carlton Football Club in the Victorian Football League (VFL).
