= Mick Keighery =

Australian rules footballer, born 1918

Personal information
- Full name: Mick Keighery
- Born: 17 June 1918
- Died: 24 December 1968 (aged 50)
- Original team: Leongatha

Playing career^{1}
Years	Club	Games (Goals)
1939	Fitzroy	1 (0)
- ^{1} Playing statistics correct to the end of 1939.

Mick Keighery (17 June 1918 – 24 December 1968) was a former Australian rules footballer who played with Fitzroy in the Victorian Football League (VFL).
