= Ivan Rasmussen =

Australian rules footballer

Personal information
- Full name: Ivan Rasmussen
- Born: 23 July 1952 (age 74)
- Original team: Leongatha
- Height: 178 cm (5 ft 10 in)
- Weight: 72 kg (159 lb)
- Position: Half Forward

Playing career^{1}
Years	Club	Games (Goals)
1973–75	Footscray	35 (42)
1976	Port Melbourne	
1983	Sorrento	17 (unknown)
- ^{1} Playing statistics correct to the end of 1975.

Ivan Rasmussen (born 23 July 1952) is a former Australian rules footballer who played with Footscray in the Victorian Football League (VFL).
