= Ian Salmon =

Australian rules footballer

Personal information
- Full name: Ian Salmon
- Born: 4 November 1952 (age 73)
- Original team: Leongatha
- Height: 194 cm (6 ft 4 in)
- Weight: 92 kg (203 lb)

Playing career^{1}
Years	Club	Games (Goals)
1970–76	Footscray	113 (36)
- ^{1} Playing statistics correct to the end of 1976.

Ian Salmon (born 4 November 1952) is a former Australian rules footballer who played with Footscray in the Victorian Football League (VFL).
