= Bethanga =

- Town
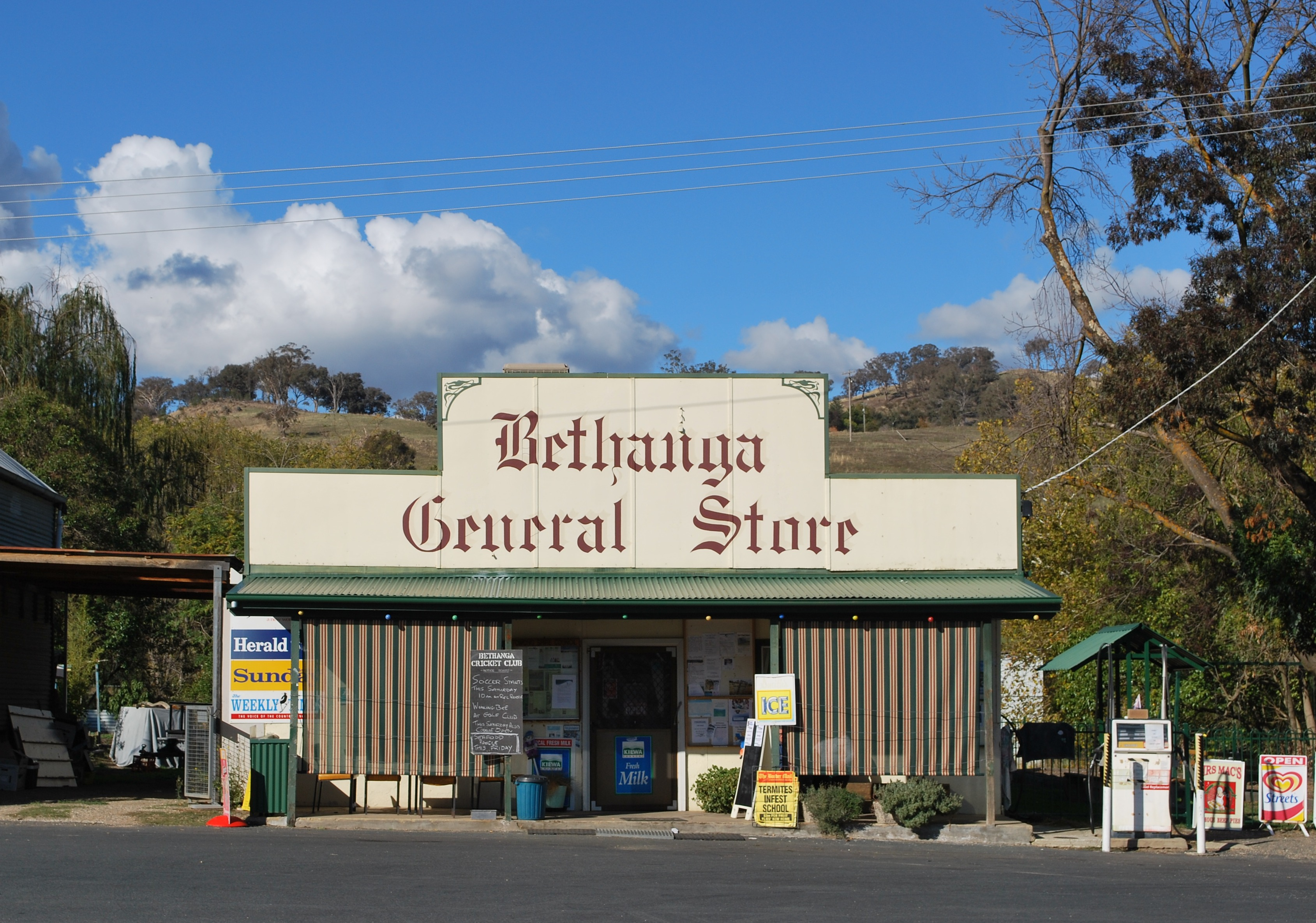
- General store

- Interactive map of Bethanga
- Coordinates: 36°07′S 147°06′E
- Country: Australia
- State: Victoria
- Region: Hume
- LGA: Shire of Towong
- Location: 390 km (240 mi) NE of Melbourne; 27 km (17 mi) E of Wodonga; 31 km (19 mi) N of Tallangatta; 9 km (5.6 mi) SE of Bellbridge

Government
  - State electorate: Benambra
  - Federal division: Indi

Population
  - Total: 589 (2006 census)
- Postcode: 3691

Bethanga is a town in north-eastern Victoria, Australia in the Shire of Towong local government area, 390 kilometres (242 mi) from the state capital, Melbourne. At the 2016 census, Bethanga had a population of 471 and gives its name to the Bethanga Bridge.

== Mining History ==
=== Mining prior to 1876 ===
Prior to 1876 gold mining in the Bethanga district occurred to the north of the town and were known as the 'Talgarno diggings'. Reports of alluvial gold date back to 1852. Early gold fields were worked at Ruby Creek, Gold Creek and Jarvis Creek. The opening of the Bethanga goldfields began with the discovery of a gold-bearing quartz reef on New Years Day 1876. The 'Gift' mine site is located south east of Kurrajong Gap lookout to the west of Bethanga township.

=== Mining 1876 - 1910 ===
Bethanga was established as a result of the discovery of gold. Gold was first reported in the Bethanga area in 1852, but it was not until 1876 that the discovery of a reef led to the development of the Bethanga goldfields.

The Great Eastern Copper Smelting Works was opened in 1878.

The post office opened on 22 July 1876, was renamed Granya in 1879 when a new office named Bethanga opened nearby which closed in 1952. The Bethanga Lower office was renamed Bethanga in 1984.

Due to the nature of the gold-bearing quartz reef, the gold was difficult to extract and the discovery of copper led to a change in focus. It was not until the early 1890s that an efficient technique for extracting the gold from the ore was discovered, and once again gold became the primary focus, with copper a by-product. Bethanga was removed from the list of goldfields in 1912, however some mining activity has taken place since.

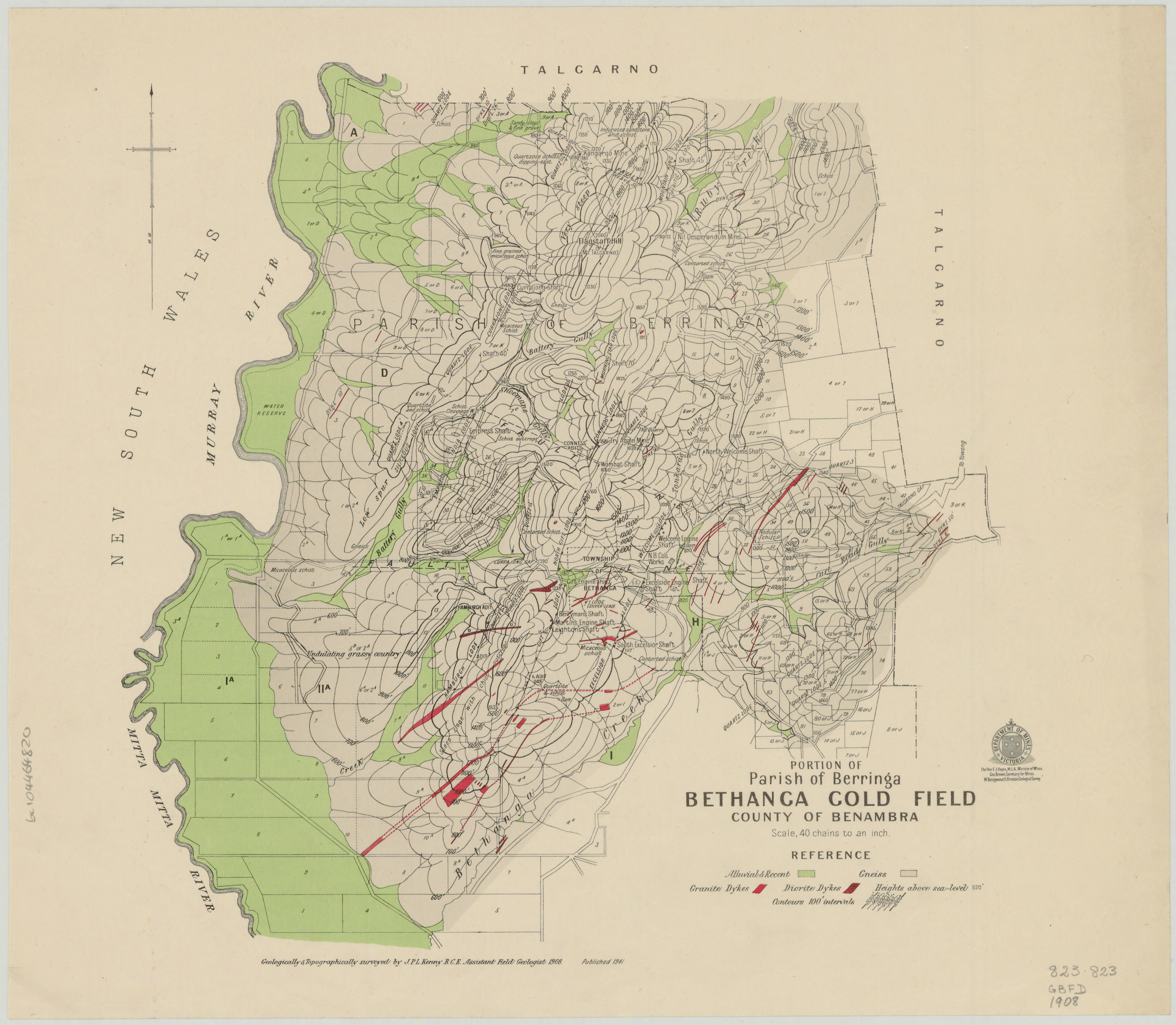
Portion of parish of Berringa, Bethanga gold field, county of Benambra / geologically and topographically surveyed by J.P.L Kenny, B. C. E Assistant Field Geologist, 1908.

== Geology and Natural History ==
=== Geology ===
The Bethanga township is located in the Lachlan orogen. Compression and folding of Ordovician sediments during the Benambram orogeny, resulted in the creation of the gneisses and schists found in the Bethanga area. Bethanga gneisses are found on the hilltops and ridges around the Bethanga area. The sulphides of Iead, copper, iron, zinc, together with gold and silver, have been found associated with the gneissic rocks, both in lodes and disseminated. Auriferous quartz reefs which occur through the gneiss were mined over a period from 1875 to about 1911.

=== Vegetation ===
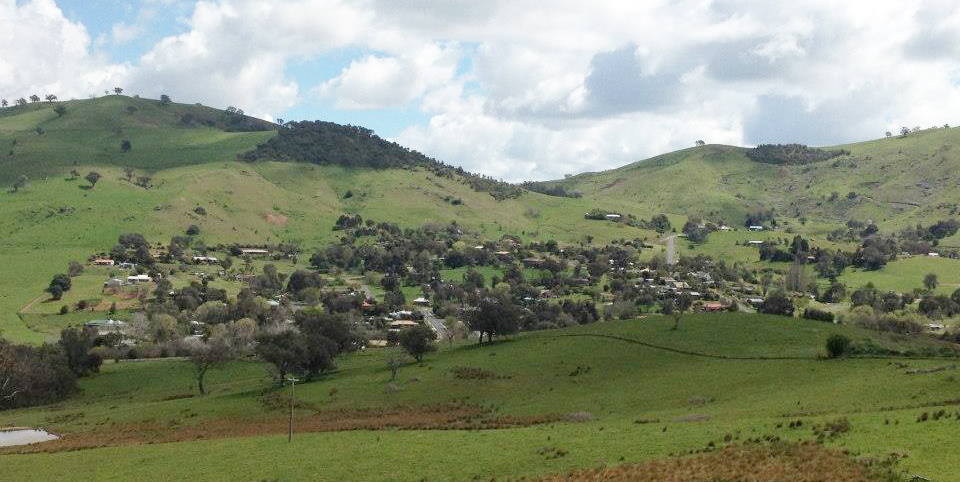
Bethanga township

The vegetation surrounding Bethanga is dominated by two vegetation classes, Valley Grassy Forest and Grassy Woodland. The Box Gum vegetation on the hillocks around the Bethanga townships were extensively cleared during the 19th century as part of the mining operations.

== Today ==
The town is located close to Lake Hume, attracting both retired people and commuters to nearby Albury-Wodonga.

=== Facilities ===
==== Bethanga Primary School ====
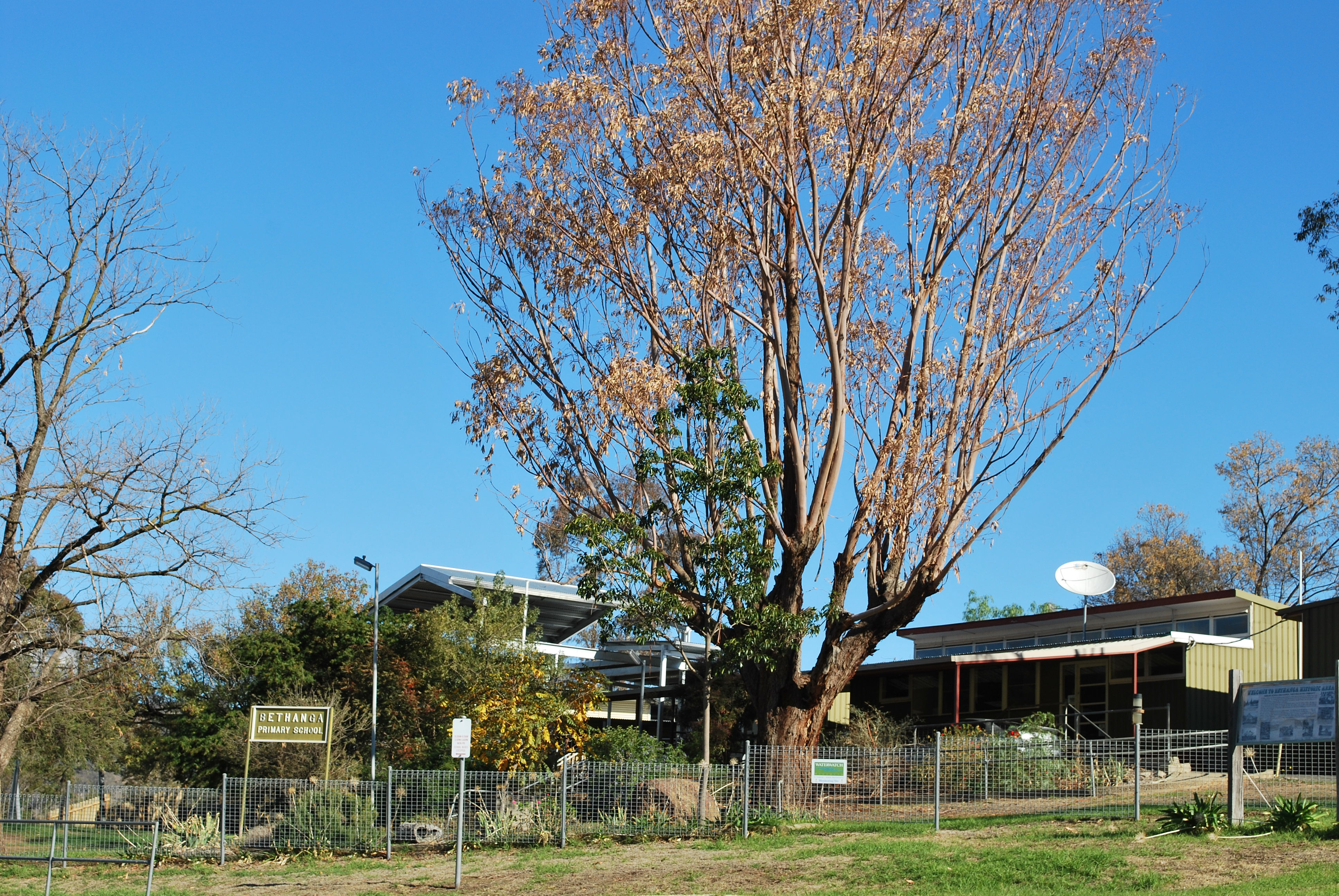
Bethanga Primary School

The Bethanga Primary School was first established in 1876 after a petition was sent to the Education Department of Victoria by the mining community of Bethanga.

==== Bethanga General Store ====
Services from the Bethanga general store include take away food, fresh and dry store consumables, household goods, and company from the locals.

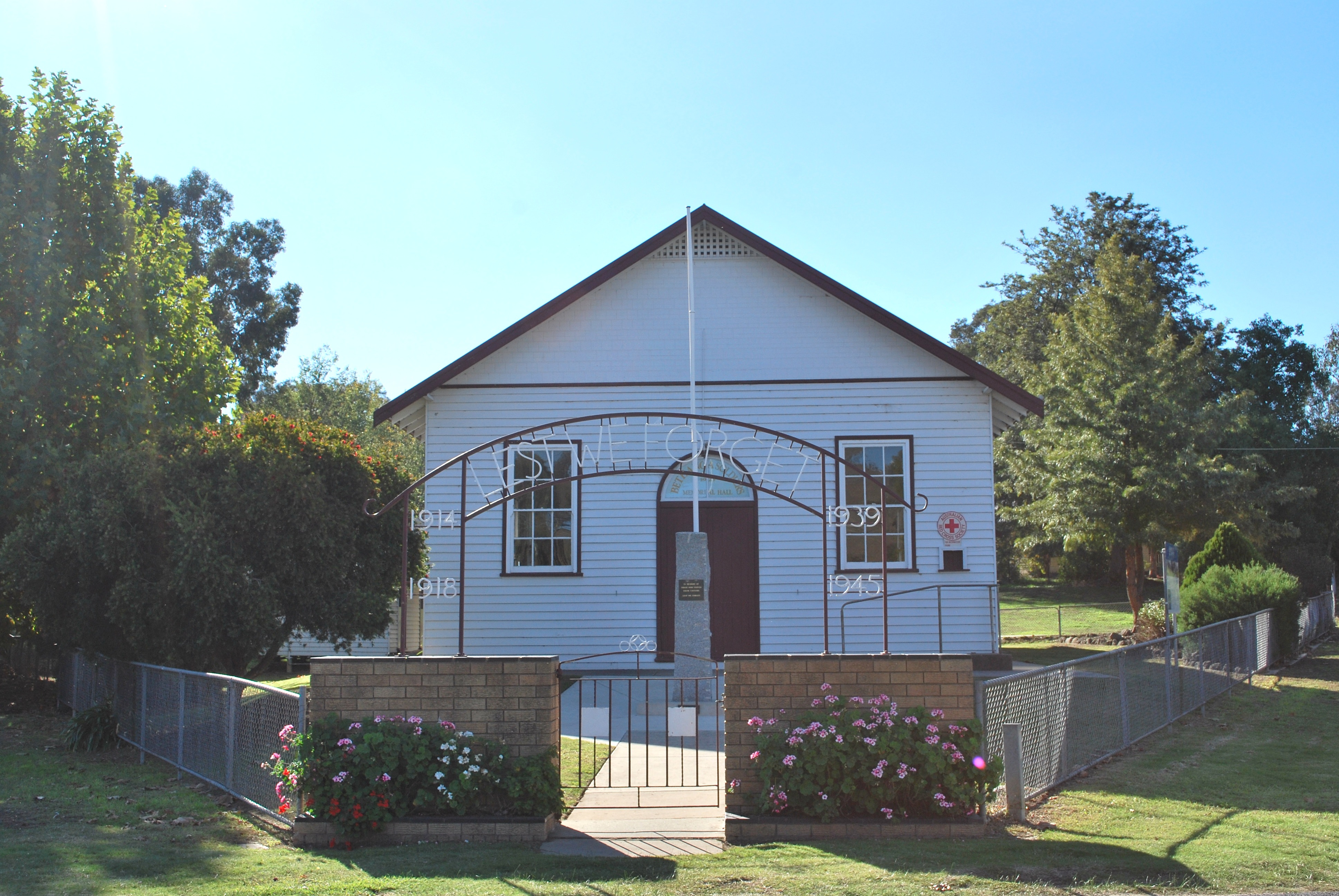
Bethanga Soldiers Memorial Hall

==== Bethanga Soldiers Memorial Hall ====
The Bethanga Soldiers Memorial Hall is the venue for the ANZAC day remembrance ceremony each year and displays the Bethanga honour role and serviceman record. The hall and supper room is used for functions and meetings.

==== Churches ====
Bethanga has two churches. Holy Trinity Anglican Church in Church St, Bethanga and the Catholic Church of St Francis in Bridge Road.

==== Bethanga Post Office ====
The Bethanga Post Office provides postal services and PO box rentals and is a Commonwealth Bank agent.

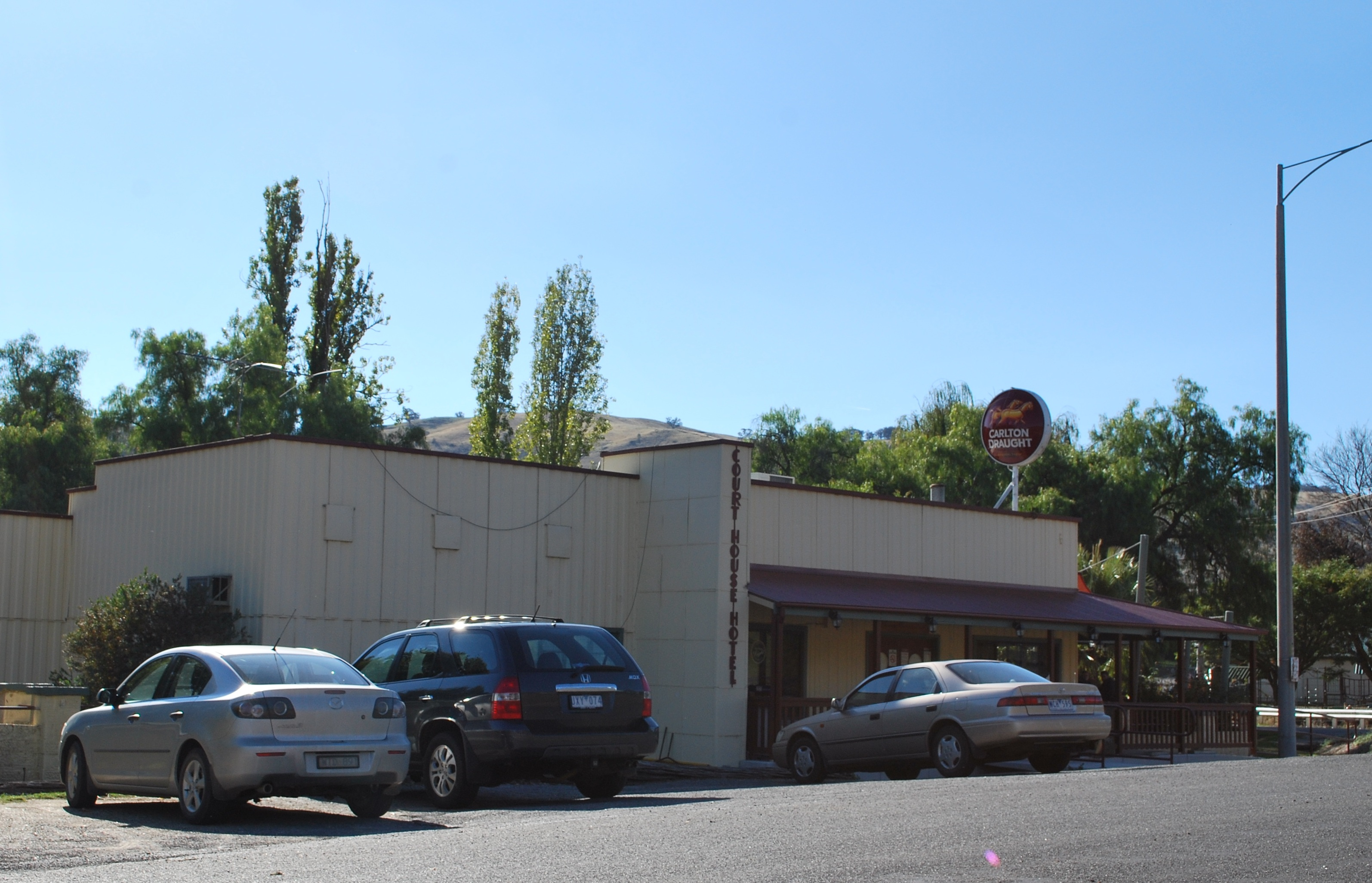
Bethanga Courthouse Hotel

==== Courthouse Hotel ====
Established in 1878 the Courthouse Hotel serves beer and food and has a shaded beer garden.

=== Emergency services ===
==== Victorian Police ====
The Victoria police force have a police station in Bethanga.

==== Bethanga and District Rural Fire Brigade ====
The Bethanga Bush Fire Brigade was formed in 1938 and at the formation of the Country Fire Authority (1945) was affiliated as the Bethanga and District Rural Fire Brigade. The Brigade has a satellite station in the nearby Bellbridge township, and is part of the Tallangatta group in district 24 of Hume Region. In 2015, the brigade celebrated the 70th anniversary of affiliation with the Country Fire Authority.

==== Community Emergency Response Team ====
The Bethanga Community Emergency Response Team (CERT) consist of ambulance volunteers who function as ‘first responders' and provide basic emergency care until the ambulance arrives.

=== Sport and recreation ===
==== Bethanga Golf Club ====
Golfers play at the Bethanga and District Golf Club (a seasonal club open only April to September) on Bethanga-Tallangatta Road.

==== Bethanga Saints Football Club ====
The Bethanga Saints Football Club, were based at Bethanga from their formation in 1907, with a number of years spent either in recess or part of the merged "Bethanga-Granya FC". In 2001 the club relocated to Wodonga, Victoria and changed the club name to Wodonga Saints. The relocation aimed to attracted new players and membership in an effort to prevent the club from folding. Commencing in 2013, Wodonga Saints played one home match per season at the Bethanga Recreation Reserve as its annual Back To Bethanga match.

==== Bethanga Saints Cricket Club ====
There is a cricket club that currently has an A and B grade team in the Albury - Wodonga Cricket competition.

==== Bethanga Recreation Reserve ====
The Bethanga Recreation Reserve is a parcel of crown land which has been zoned for public recreation. Facilities at the reserve include sports oval, tennis courts, netball courts, and horse paddocks. The reserve also has club rooms with and kiosk. Every Easter weekend the reserve hosts the Bethanga Gymkhana.

==== Hume Soccer Club ====
The Hume soccer club provides an opportunity for young soccer player to meet and train during the Autumn and Winter months.

==== Bethanga Pony Club ====
The Bethanga Pony club is a designated Pony Club have monthly training meetings.
