= Trevor Steer =

Australian rules footballer

Personal information
- Born: 11 October 1938 (age 88)
- Original team: University Blacks
- Height: 192 cm (6 ft 4 in)
- Weight: 84.5 kg (186 lb)

Playing career^{1}
Years	Club	Games (Goals)
1961–1966	Collingwood	88 (45)
- ^{1} Playing statistics correct to the end of 1966.

Career highlights
- Collingwood best and fairest 1965; Collingwood vice captain 1966

Trevor Steer (born 11 October 1938) is a former Australian rules footballer who played with Collingwood in the VFL during the 1960s.

Steer joined Collingwood from University Blacks in 1961 as a tall and reliable defender and played in two Grand Finals for Collingwood (1964 & 1966). He was made vice captain in 1966 and led the team to a Grand Final, which Collingwood lost. It was his last game for the Magpies. His best season came in 1965 when he won the Copeland Trophy for Collingwood's Best and Fairest player.
