= Ron Black =

Ron Black may refer to:

- Ronald Black (born 1935), member of the Pennsylvania House of Representatives
- Ron Black (footballer) (1908–1983), Australian rules footballer
