= Johnny Dalton =

Australian rules footballer, born 1919

Personal information
- Full name: John Dalton
- Born: 10 August 1919; Port Fairy, Victoria
- Died: 24 November 1982 (aged 63); Wangaratta, Victoria
- Original team: Moyhu

Playing career^{1}
Years	Club	Games (Goals)
1943	Melbourne	2 (2)
- ^{1} Playing statistics correct to the end of 1943.

Johnny Dalton (10 August 1919 – 24 November 1982) was an Australian rules footballer who played with Melbourne in the Victorian Football League (VFL).

Dalton was recruited from the Moyhu in the Ovens and King Football League in 1943.

Dalton later served in the Australian Army during World War II.
