= Les Gregory =

Les Gregory may refer to:

- Les Gregory (footballer, born 1915) (1915–1999), Australian rules footballer for Carlton
- Les Gregory (footballer, born 1938), Australian rules footballer for St Kilda
- Les Gregory (speedway rider) (1914–1993), English speedway rider
