= Neil Ferguson =

Neil Ferguson is the name of:

- Neil Ferguson (epidemiologist) (born 1968), British infectious disease epidemiologist
- Neil Ferguson (footballer) (1945–2016), former Australian rules footballer
- Neil Ferguson, musician with British band Chumbawamba

== See also ==
- Niall Ferguson (born 1964), British historian
- Niels Ferguson (born 1965), Dutch cryptographer
- Neil Layton Fergusson (1908–1994), Canadian politician
