= Gary Holmes =

Gary Holmes may refer to:

- Gary Holmes (footballer) (1938–2020), Australian rules footballer
- Gary Holmes (wrestler) (born 1965), Canadian wrestler
