= Ken Bennett (Australian footballer) =

Australian rules footballer (1940–2023)

Personal information
- Full name: Kenneth Raymond Bennett
- Born: 14 February 1940
- Died: 1 September 2023 (aged 83)
- Original team: Dandenong
- Height: 166 cm (5 ft 5 in)
- Weight: 70 kg (154 lb)
- Positions: Wing, forward

Playing career^{1}
| Years | Club | Games (Goals) |
| 1957–1962 | Collingwood | 56 (37) |
- ^{1} Playing statistics correct to the end of 1962.

Career highlights
- 1958 VFL premiership; 1963 O&MFL Morris Medal

Kenneth Raymond Bennett (14 February 1940 – 1 September 2023) was an Australian rules footballer who played for Collingwood in the Victorian Football League (VFL) during the late 1950s and early 1960s.

Bennett, originally from Dandenong, was just 17 years old when he debuted midway through the 1957 season. Although primarily a wingman he was also used up forward and was a member of Collingwood's 1958 VFL Grand Final premiership team. Bennett kicked two goals and featured in their best players in Collingwood's 1958 premiership.

In 1963, Bennett (Albury) won the 1963 Ovens & Murray Football League best and fairest award, the Morris Medal, with 17 votes, from John Perry (Wodonga) and Graeme Leydin (Wangaratta Rovers), both on 16 votes. Ken was also captain-coach of Albury in 1963 too, prior to Murray Weideman taking on the role.

Ken Bennett died on 1 September 2023, at the age of 83.

== Sources ==
- Ken Bennett's playing statistics from AFL Tables
- Holmesby, Russell and Main, Jim (2007). The Encyclopedia of AFL Footballers. 7th ed. Melbourne: Bas Publishing.
