= Gil Patrick =

Australian rules footballer, born 1908

Personal information
- Full name: Gilbert Kearly Patrick
- Born: 22 January 1908; Beechworth, Victoria
- Died: 6 August 1995 (aged 87)
- Original team: Wangaratta Rovers

Playing career^{1}
Years	Club	Games (Goals)
1929	Footscray	3 (1)
- ^{1} Playing statistics correct to the end of 1929.

Gilbert Kearly Patrick (22 January 1908 – 6 August 1995) was an Australian rules footballer who played with Footscray in the Victorian Football League (VFL).

Patrick was recruited from the Wangaratta Rovers, who were playing in the Ovens & King Football League and was Footscray's best player on his debut in round three, 1929 against North Melbourne.

Patrick later served in the Royal Australian Air Force during World War II.
