= Norm Bussell =

Australian rules footballer (born 1945)

Personal information
- Born: 6 January 1945 (age 81)
- Original teams: King Valley, Wangaratta Rovers (OMFL)
- Height: 193 cm (6 ft 4 in)
- Weight: 91 kg (201 lb)

Playing career^{1}
Years	Club	Games (Goals)
1960–1961	King Valley	
1962–1967 & 1974-1976	Wangaratta Rovers	146 (28)
1968–1973	Hawthorn	113 (2)
1977–1980	Whorouly	
- ^{1} Playing statistics correct to the end of 1973.

Career highlights
- VFL Premiership: 1971; O&MFL Premierships: 1964, 1965, 1974, 1975; O&KFL Premierships: 1977 & 1978; Wangaratta Rovers Best & Fairest: 1967 & 1975; Wangaratta Rovers: Hall of Fame - 2008

Norman 'Norm' Bussell (born 6 January 1945) is a former Australian rules footballer who played with Hawthorn in the VFL.

== Early career ==
Bussell was a highly rated youngster who initially played with King Valley in the Ovens & King Football League from 1960 to 1961, then moved onto play with Wangaratta Rovers in the Ovens & Murray Football League in 1962. He developed with the help of VFL legend Bob Rose, who was coaching Wangaratta Rovers in the Ovens and Murray FL.

When Rose was appointed to coach Collingwood he got Bussell to sign a Form Four registration tying him to Collingwood. Bussell refused to move to Melbourne as he was competing an Auto Electrical apprenticeship. A few years later after his form four had expired, Hawthorn managed to persuade Bussell to move to Hawthorn.

== VFL career ==
Bussell was a centre half back and his no-fuss tough approach to the game saw him play 113 games.

The highlight of his career was the 1971 VFL Grand Final / Premiership. Bussell played an important role in one of the most brutal games in VFL history.

== After VFL ==
After sustaining a back injury Bussell decided to retire from VFL football. He returned to Wangaratta Rovers, playing in their 1974 and 1975 Ovens & Murray Football League premierships. Bussell then went onto captain-coach Whorouly in the Ovens & King Football League to premierships in 1977 and 1978, then runners up in 1979 and 1980, before retiring as a player. Bussell then coached Myrtleford in the Ovens & Murray Football League in 1985.

His son Aidan was drafted by Hawthorn 1991 AFL draft but he never played a senior AFL game.
