= Luke Mullins =

Australian rules footballer (born 1984)

Personal information
- Full name: Luke Mullins
- Born: 24 December 1984 (age 41)
- Original teams: Wangaratta Rovers / Murray Bushrangers
- Draft: 7th, 2003 Pre-Season Draft
- Height: 187 cm (6 ft 2 in)
- Weight: 82 kg (181 lb)

Playing career^{1}
Years	Club	Games (Goals)
2004	Collingwood	3 (0)
- ^{1} Playing statistics correct to the end of 2004.

Luke Mullins (born 24 December 1984) is an Australian rules footballer who played with Collingwood in the Australian Football League (AFL).

Mullins played his early football with the Wangaratta Rovers and was picked up by Collingwood in the 2003 Pre-Season Draft, from the Murray Bushrangers. He made his debut against Fremantle at Docklands in the fourth round of the 2004 AFL season and had 13 disposals. His only other games were against St Kilda and Adelaide in rounds eight and nine respectively.
