= Vic Donald =

Australian rules footballer

Personal information
- Full name: James Vickers Donald
- Born: 17 February 1925; Millgrove, Victoria
- Died: 8 August 2002 (aged 77); Albury, New South Wales
- Original team: Clifton Hill YCW
- Height: 185 cm (6 ft 1 in)
- Weight: 76 kg (168 lb)
- Position: follower / centre half forward

Playing career^{1}
Years	Club	Games (Goals)
1948–49	Collingwood	10 (3)
- ^{1} Playing statistics correct to the end of 1949.

James Vickers 'Vic' Donald (17 February 1925 – 8 August 2002) was an Australian rules footballer who played with Collingwood in the Victorian Football League (VFL), who hailed from Clifton Hill YCW.

After making his debut in 1948, round 18, Donald was injured in the 1948 VFL first semi final and missed out on selection in Collingwood's 1948 preliminary final loss to Melbourne.

Donald fractured his cheekbone in a practice match with Collingwood in April 1950, then trained with Richmond in late April 1950.

Donald later played with the Preston Football Club in 1950.

Donald was later captain-coach of the Bogong Football Club and led them to the 1955 premiership in the Ovens & King Football League.

Donald played with Wangaratta in the Ovens & Murray Football League in 1957 and 1958 and kicked 26 goals.

His grandson, Daryl Donald from the Wangaratta Football Club was drafted at No. 35 to Geelong Football Club in the 1991 AFL draft.
