= Graham Leydin =

Australian rules footballer (born 1940)

Personal information
- Full name: Graham William Leydin
- Born: 21 March 1940
- Original team: Moonee Valley
- Height: 173 cm (5 ft 8 in)
- Weight: 67 kg (148 lb)

Playing career^{1}
Years	Club	Games (Goals)
1959–61, 1964	Essendon	35 (18)
- ^{1} Playing statistics correct to the end of 1964.

Graham William Leydin (born 21 March 1940) is a former Australian rules footballer who played with Essendon in the Victorian Football League (VFL). Nicknamed Yabbie, Leydin won a best and fairest at the Essendon Under-19s in 1958.

He played mostly as a rover or at half forward and arrived at Essendon from Moonee Valley. Leydin usually came off the bench during his VFL career, which is from where he started the 1959 VFL Grand Final, which Essendon lost to Melbourne. He made 16 appearances in each of his first two seasons but played just two games in 1961.

Due to his employment, he had to move to the country in 1962 and began playing for the Wangaratta Rovers and he won their best and fairest in 1962. He was runner up in the 1963 Ovens & Murray Football League best and fairest award, the Morris Medal to former Collingwood premiership player, Ken Bennett.

Leydin briefly returned to Essendon in 1964 and after adding just one more game to his VFL tally, finished the season at Brunswick. His time with Brunswick included a stint as captain and ended when he joined the Doutta Stars as captain-coach in 1972. He guided the Stars to a premiership in his first year and then retired as a player, but remained as coach until 1975.

His coaching career took him back to Moonee Valley, where he was in charge for two seasons, before acting as senior coach of Strathmore in 1978 and 1979. Leydin coached Essendon's Under-19s side for a season in 1981 and then spent six years as a member of the North Melbourne coaching staff, working as a junior development officer and assistant coach. He returned to Strathmore in 1988 for another two year stint as senior coach.

Leydin played 53 first eleven games for North Melbourne Cricket Club from 1957/58 to 1968/69.

Leydin won the Wangaratta & District Cricket Association's A. Grade batting average and aggregate in 1962/63 and 1963/64.

He was a proficient cricketer in Wangaratta during the early 1960s and represented the Victorian Country Cricket League team which hosted both the Marylebone Cricket Club in Shepparton in December 1962 and South Africa at Benalla in December 1963.
