= Andrew Scott (Australian footballer) =

Australian rules footballer

Personal information
- Full name: Andrew John Scott
- Born: 12 March 1952 (age 74)
- Original team: Sorrento
- Height: 183 cm (6 ft 0 in)
- Weight: 75kg (11.81 st)
- Positions: half forward, ruck rover

Playing career^{1}
| Years | Club | Games (Goals) |
| 1972–1973 | Hawthorn | Snr 6 (4), Res (unknown) |
| 1975–1985 | Wangaratta Rovers | 181 (248) |
| 1968-71,74 (snr) | Sorrento | 90 (unknown) |
| 1964-67 (U15) | Sorrento | 45 (unknown) |
- ^{1} Playing statistics correct to the end of 1985.

Career highlights
- Sorrento FC: Premiership: 1969; Club B&F: 1971; Wangaratta Rovers FNC: Premierships: 1975, 1977, 78, 79; Club B&F: 1977,1980; O&MFL B&F: 1975 (shared); WRFNC & O&MFNL Hall of Fame: 2004 & 2013; WRFNC Life Member: 1975

Andrew John Scott (born 12 March 1952) is a former Australian rules footballer who played with Hawthorn in the Victorian Football League (VFL).

Scott made his senior VFL debut in 1972, when Hawthorn were reigning premiers. He played a total of four games that year and another two the following season.

A former policeman, turned plumber, Scott spent his career as a half forward or on-baller.

Scott represented the Victorian Second Eighteen side verses New South Wales in Sydney in 1972.

After returning briefly to Sorrento in 1974, his original club, Scott joined the Wangaratta Rovers in the Ovens & Murray Football League. He was joint winner of a Morris Medal in 1975, when he polled the equal most votes with Jack O'Halloran of the Wangaratta Football Club. That year he also played in a winning grand final side and he would be a member of three further premierships with the Rovers. Seven months after joining Rovers he was awarded Life Membership under its policy for League B&F winners.

At primary school he played 3 seasons of inter-school football and captained the side in grade 6. At high school he played 6 seasons of inter-school and house (Murray) football, cricket and athletics. On weekends he played football with SFC under 15s and cricket with SCC Colts, the latter winning the MPCA reserve grade premiership of 1965–66. He had to wait another 3 years for his first football premiership.

In 1969, he kicked 2 goals as the youngest member of Sorrento FC's 1st 18 team, defeating Seaford by 27 points at Mornington. Two years later, at the same ground, Mornington denied him another premiership by 8 goals. Several weeks later he had SFC's 1971 - best and fairest medal in his trophy cabinet.

After a 300-plus game football career the wear and tear finally took its toll. In 2015 his left knee was replaced, and 2019 his preferred right-side is scheduled for the same.
