= Zac O'Brien =

Australian rules footballer (born 1990)

Personal information
- Full name: Zachary O'Brien
- Nickname: Donk
- Born: 27 October 1990 (age 36)
- Original team: Wangaratta Rovers
- Draft: No. 23, 2014 Rookie Draft
- Height: 183 cm (6 ft 0 in)
- Weight: 78 kg (172 lb)
- Position: Forward

Club information
- Current club: Gold Coast reserves
- Number: 0

Playing career^{1}
Years	Club	Games (Goals)
2014–2015	Brisbane Lions	13 (1)
- ^{1} Playing statistics correct to the end of 2015.

Zachary O'Brien (born 27 October 1990) is a former professional Australian rules footballer who currently plays for Gold Coast in the Victorian Football League (VFL), having previously played for the Brisbane Lions in Australian Football League (AFL).

== Career ==
=== Early career ===
O'Brien began his football career with the Wangaratta Rovers in the Ovens & Murray Football League (OMFL). After two seasons at the Rovers, he joined the Yarrawonga Football Club in 2010.

He left regional Victoria and moved to Melbourne in 2012, joining the Aberfeldie Football Club in the Essendon District Football League (EDFL).

In 2013, he remained with Aberfeldie while also joining Essendon's reserves team in the Victorian Football League (VFL), where he played 11 games and kicked three goals.

=== AFL ===
O'Brien was drafted by the Lions with the 23rd selection in 2014 rookie draft. He was promoted to the senior list during the week before their round 11, 2014 clash against the Carlton Football Club. He was delisted in October 2015.

=== Post-AFL ===
After being delisted, O'Brien joined West Adelaide in the South Australian National Football League (SANFL) for the 2016 season.

In 2024, O'Brien joined the reserves team of the Gold Coast Suns in the VFL. He made his debut for the Suns in round 3 of the 2024 season against Box Hill.
