= Alan Dale (footballer) =

Australian rules footballer

Personal information
- Born: 14 November 1929
- Died: 21 April 2007 (aged 77)
- Original team: Doutta Stars
- Height: 177 cm (5 ft 10 in)
- Weight: 78 kg (172 lb)

Playing career^{1}
Years	Club	Games (Goals)
1950–1956	Essendon	45 (3)
1956–1957	St Kilda	17 (2)
Total		62 (5)
- ^{1} Playing statistics correct to the end of 1957.

Career highlights
- Essendon Premiership 1950

Alan Dale (14 November 1929 – 21 April 2007) was an Australian rules footballer who played for Essendon and St Kilda in the Victorian Football League (VFL).

Recruited to Essendon from local club Doutta Stars, where he won the 1947 VFL Under 19's best and fairest award, the Morrish Medal.

Dale played in Essendon's losing 1949 VFL Reserves grand final side against Melbourne.

Dale debuted in the 1950 VFL season and ended the year as a member of Essendon's 1950 VFL Grand Final premiership side. Dale was also played in the 1951 VFL Grand Final loss to Geelong.

Dale, a centreman, captain-coached the Wangaratta Rovers in the 1954 and 1955 Ovens & Murray Football League seasons.

He returned to Essendon in 1956, but later in the year switched to St Kilda.

Dale played with Belgrave, Oakleigh and Mt Waverley after leaving the VFL.
