= Wangaratta Rovers Football Club =

Australian rules football club

Names
- Full name: Wangaratta Rovers Football / Netball Club Incorporated.
- Nickname: Hawks
- Motto: The Family Club

2026 season
- After finals: 1st (Premiers)
- Home-and-away season: 2nd
- Leading goalkicker: 55: Will Christie
- Bob Rose Medal: 2026: Mitch Hardie

Club details
- Founded: 1922; 104 years ago (entered O&MFL in 1950)
- Colours: Brown Gold
- Competition: Ovens and Murray Football League
- President: Wendy Lester
- Coach: Sam Murray
- Captain: Xavier Allison/Tom Boyd
- Premierships: 18: O&MFL
- Ground: W. J. Findlay Oval (capacity: 10,000)
- (1953 onwards)
- Training ground: W. J. Findlay Oval

Uniforms
Home	Away 1

Other information
- Official website: wangrovers.com.au

The Wangaratta Rovers Football Club, nicknamed the Hawks, is an Australian rules football club based in the Victorian city of Wangaratta.

== History ==
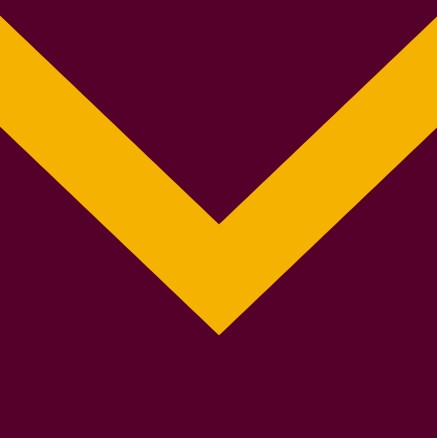
Club Jumper: 1950 - 55

Wangaratta Rovers were initially formed in 1922 and competed in the Wangaratta District Football Association (WDFA) from 1922 to 1924, then moved across to the Ovens and King Football League (O&KFL) from 1925 to 1929. Wangaratta Rovers lost both the 1922 and the 1923 WDFA grand finals to Milawa.

Wangaratta Rovers actually merged with the Wangaratta Football Club in 1930, who then entered one team in the Ovens and Murray Football League and one team in the O&KFL.

The Wangaratta Rovers re-formed in 1945 and competed in the O&KFL from 1945 to 1949, winning the 1948 premiership and losing to Myrtleford in the 1949 O&KFL grand final, before joining the Ovens & Murray Football League in 1950.

== Football Premierships ==
Seniors

- Ovens and King Football League (1)
  - 1948
- Ovens and Murray Football League (18)
  - 1958, 1960, 1964, 1965, 1971, 1972, 1974, 1975, 1977, 1978, 1979, 1988, 1991, 1993, 1994, 2024, 2025, 2026
- Ovens and Murray Football League Pre Season Premiership
  - 1975, 1990
- Goulburn Murray Night Football League (Pre season competition at Katandra)
  - 1986, 1992

Reserves

- Ovens and Murray Football League (9)
  - 1958, 1962, 1976, 1977, 1980, 1983, 1984, 2007, 2026.

Under 18 / Thirds

- Ovens and Murray Football League (12)
  - 1980, 1985, 1988, 1995, 1996, 1998, 1999, 2002, 2003, 2008, 2018, 2024.

== Netball Premiership ==
A. Grade

- Ovens and Murray Football League (4)
  - 1993, 1994, 2005, 2006,

B. Grade

- Ovens and Murray Football League (1)
  - 1999

C. Grade

- Ovens and Murray Football League (3)
  - 1996, 2025, 2026

17 & Under

- Ovens and Murray Football League (2)
  - 2019, 2025,

== League Best & Fairest Award Winners ==
Seniors

- Ovens & Murray Football League - Morris Medal
  - 1958 & 1960 - Bob Rose
  - 1966 - Neville Hogan
  - 1975 - Andrew Scott
  - 1991, 1997, 1999, 2001 & 2003 - Robert Walker
  - 2025 - Lochie O'Brien

Reserves

- Ovens & Murray Football League
  - 1969 - Alan Daniel
  - 1975 - Barry Clarke
  - 1979 - Malcom Dalton
  - 1982 - Ian Gambold
  - 1989 - Andrew Robinson
  - 2021 - Mitchell Booth
  - 2024 - Noah Amery

Thirds / Under 18's

- Ovens & Murray Football League
  - 1984 - Chris O'Connor
  - 1989 - Daine Hochfeld*
    (Polled the most votes, but was disqualified due to an abusive language suspension)
  - 1996 - Daniel McLaughlin
  - 2002 - Jamie Allan
  - 2005 - Ben Reid
  - 2007 - Zac O'Brien
  - 2016 & 2017 - Paul Sanderson
  - 2018 - Ed Dayman
  - 2019 - Alessandro Belci
  - 2023 - Riley Allan

== VFL / AFL Players ==
The following footballers played with Wangaratta Rovers, prior to playing senior football in the VFL/AFL, and / or drafted, with the year indicating their VFL/AFL debut.

- 1929 - Gil Patrick - Footscray
- 1950 - Mac Hill - Collingwood
- 1956 - Alan Dale - St. Kilda
- 1959 - Kevin Dellar - Essendon
- 1959 - Les Gregory - St. Kilda
- 1964 - Barrie Beattie - Footscray
- 1964 - Graeme Leydin - Essendon
- 1967 - Mike Hallahan - Fitzroy
- 1968 - Norm Bussell - Hawthorn
- 1972 - Phil Doherty - North Melbourne
- 1973 - Mick Nolan - North Melbourne
- 1975 - John Byrne - North Melbourne
- 1985 - Rohan Robertson - North Melbourne
- 1985 - Shane Robertson - North Melbourne
- 1987 - Paul Bryce - North Melbourne
- 1987 - Craig Patrick - North Melbourne, Pick No.35
- 1988 - Scott Williamson - West Coast Eagles, Pick No.44
- 1989 - Joe Wilson - Brisbane Bears, Pick No.51
- 1990 - Tim Rieniets - Carlton
- 1990 - Robert Hickmott - Melbourne
- 1990 - Scott Williamson - Melbourne, No. 31 (1990 Pre season draft)
- 1991 - Dean Harding - Fitzroy
- 2001 - Andrew Hill - Collingwood, No.39 (2001 AFL Rookie Draft)
- 2002 - Sean O'Keeffe - Carlton
- 2003 - Karl Norman - Carlton
- 2004 - Luke Mullins - St. Kilda
- 2006 - Alipate Carlile - Port Adelaide
- 2007 - Ben Reid - Collingwood
- 2010 - Sam Reid - Sydney Swans
- 2014 - Zac O'Brien - Brisbane Lions
- 2021 - Nick Murray - Adelaide Crows
- 2022 - Brayden George - North Melbourne
- 2023 - Darcy Wilson - St. Kilda
- 2024 - Toby Murray - Adelaide Crows

The following footballers played senior VFL / AFL football prior to playing and / or coaching with Wangaratta Rovers with the year indicating their first season at WRFNC.

- 1950 - Ken Bodger - Hawthorn
- 1954 - Alan Dale - St. Kilda
- 1956 - Bob Rose - Collingwood
- 1962 - Graeme Leydin - Essendon
- 1964 - Ken Boyd - South Melbourne
- 1964 - Frank Hogan - South Melbourne
- 1965 - Bob Hempel - Footscray
- 1967 - Ian Brewer - Collingwood
- 1968 - Hugh Earnshaw - Geelong
- 1975 - Andrew Scott - Hawthorn
- 1981 - Phil Seaton - Melbourne
- 1983 - Gerry McCarthy - Hawthorn & Fitzroy
- 1987 - Peter Tossol - Melbourne
- 2001 - Nick Trask - Brisbane Bears
- 2012 - Barry Hall - St. Kilda, Sydney Swans & Footscray
- 2014 - Daniel Archer - St. Kilda
- 2014 - Jarrad Boumann - Hawthorn
- 2014 - James Mulligan - Footscray
- 2019 - Daryn Cresswell - Sydney Swans
- 2021 - Matt Jones - Melbourne
- 2021 - Sam Murray - Collingwood
- 2024 - Lochie O'Brien - Carlton
- 2024 - Eddie Betts - Carlton & Adelaide Crows

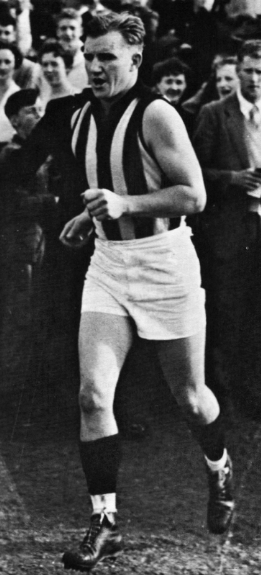
Bob Rose: Captain/Coach - 1956 to 1962
