= Alan Jarrott =

Australian rules footballer

Personal information
- Full name: Alan Jarrott
- Born: 17 August 1956 (age 70)
- Original team: Mohyu
- Height: 182 cm (6 ft 0 in)
- Weight: 90 kg (198 lb)
- Position: Ruck-rover / half back flank

Playing career^{1}
Years	Club	Games (Goals)
1977–1981	North Melbourne	79 (31)
1982–1987	Melbourne	91 (26)
Total		170 (57)
- ^{1} Playing statistics correct to the end of 1987.

Alan Jarrott (born 17 August 1956) is a former Australian rules footballer who played with the North Melbourne Football Club and Melbourne Football Club in the Victorian Football League (VFL).

Jarrott, who came from Moyhu in the Ovens & King Football League in rural Victoria and won the club's 1974 best and fairest award. Jarrott was also runner up in the 1974 Ovens & King Football League senior football best and fairest award, the Clyde Baker Medal, with 28 votes.

At North Melbourne was used as a half back flanker and ruck-rover during his career. He made his debut in the 17th round of the 1977 VFL season and kept his place in the side until the preliminary final, when he was dropped. As a result, he missed out on participating in North Melbourne's second 1977 premiership. He played a semi final in 1978 but again was dropped and missed the 1978 VFL Grand Final.

Noted for his accurate handballing skills, he won the handball competition on the TV show World of Sport three times.

Alan is currently the coach of the Purple Knights in the Victorian Social Football League.
