= Ken Boyd (footballer) =

Australian rules footballer (born 1938)

Personal information
- Full name: Kenneth John Boyd
- Born: 6 March 1938 (age 88)
- Original team: Southern Stars
- Height: 188 cm (6 ft 2 in)
- Weight: 86 kg (190 lb)
- Position: Ruckman

Playing career^{1}
Years	Club	Games (Goals)
1957–1961	South Melbourne	60 (37)
1962–1966	Wangaratta Rovers	82 (44)
- ^{1} Playing statistics correct to the end of 1966.

Kenneth John Boyd (born 6 March 1938) is a former Australian rules footballer who played with South Melbourne in the Victorian Football League (VFL).

Boyd, a ruckman, made his way up the South Melbourne ranks from the thirds, before starting with seniors in 1957. He spent five seasons in the VFL and developed a reputation for his rough playing style. Often falling foul of the umpires, Boyd missed a total of 30 league games during his VFL career through suspension.

In his debut season he was involved in two separate scuffles with Mike Delanty, during South Melbourne's round 15 encounter against Collingwood. He was suspended for eight matches, two for each of the striking charges and an additional four for abusing the umpire.

He battled through injuries in 1958 to play 10 games and the following season put together another 14 matches. The four games which he missed in 1959 were all as a result of a suspension for striking Essendon's Hugh Mitchell.

Boyd played 17 of a possible 18 games for South Melbourne in 1960 and then had an eventful season in 1961. In round four, Boyd was reported for striking two Carlton players in the last quarter, John Heathcote and John Nicholls. He received a six-week suspension, three for each incident. When South Melbourne met Carlton again in round 15 at Princes Park, Boyd was once again competing again Nicholls and the two ruckmen resumed hostilities. After the game, the emergency umpire claimed he had seen Boyd strike Nicholls and as he didn't have the authority to file a report, a VFL investigative committee was set up. During the week, Boyd openly admitted to a newspaper journalist that he threw the punch that had knocked Nicholls to the ground and left the Carlton player with concussion and a lacerated cheek. He claimed that it was in retaliation for Nicholls earlier kicking him during a centre bounce. It was a busy week for the South Melbourne ruckman, with his first child being born on the Monday night.

Until a verdict had been reached, Boyd was available for selection and although he missed the next game through injury, he played in South Melbourne's round 17 fixture against Essendon. His defence team went to the Supreme Court, seeking an injunction by questioning the legality of the committee but the case was dismissed by Edmund Herring, the Chief Justice. He received a 12-week suspension and at the end of the season announced his resignation.

He continued his career in the Ovens & Murray Football League, with the Wangaratta Rovers, but had to wait until midway through the season for his debut, as his suspension was carried through from the VFL. Appointed playing coach, he steered the Rovers to premierships in 1964 and 1965. Attempting to make it three premierships in a row in 1966, Wangaratta lost in the preliminary final and Boyd was given an eight-week suspension as a result of two striking charges. It wouldn't matter, as Boyd had already announced his retirement, citing his wish to return to Melbourne for work purposes and also his struggle with a back injury. He continued to be involved in football, returning to South Melbourne in 1967 to serve as a selector.
