= Karl Norman =

Australian rules football player (born 1983)

Personal information
- Born: 30 May 1983 (age 43)
- Original team: Wangaratta Rovers (O&MFL)
- Debut: 24 May 2003, Carlton vs. Brisbane Lions, at Optus Oval

Playing career^{1}
Years	Club	Games (Goals)
2003–2005	Carlton	27 (5)
- ^{1} Playing statistics correct to the end of 2005.

Karl Norman (born 30 May 1983) is an Australian rules football player, who formerly played in the Australian Football League.

From Wangaratta, Norman played his junior football for the Greta Football Club in the Ovens & King Football League & Wangaratta Rovers in the Ovens & Murray Football League. In 2001 Norman won the Glenrowan Football Club senior Best and Fairest in the Ovens & King Football League, before crossing back over to the Wangaratta Rovers. In 2002, as a 19-year-old, Norman finished equal second in the Wangaratta Rovers club best-and-fairest. His performance during the season caught the attention of recruiters at the Carlton Football Club, and Carlton recruited him to the Australian Football League with its sixth round selection in the 2002 AFL National Draft (#79 overall), despite having never played TAC Cup football. Norman's recruitment was particularly rare in the 21st century, as very few players reach the Australian Football League without having played either senior or under-18s football at state level.

Norman made his debut in mid-2003, playing seven games in his first season. However, in 2004, Norman made headlines when, after the team's Round 2 win against Geelong, he and controversial team-mate Laurence Angwin arrived at the following day's recovery session under the influence of ecstasy. Angwin had been involved in several previous indiscretions, and was sacked immediately; Norman received a one-match suspension and strict behavioural conditions from the club, with the club believing that he could improve his off-field behaviour in Angwin's absence. Following his suspension, Norman played another fourteen matches for the season.

In early 2005, Norman was again accused of an off-field indiscretion relating to unpaid rent and leaving the property in a poor condition, following his eviction. He played only four games for Carlton during the 2005 season, spending the rest playing for Carlton's VFL-affiliate, the Northern Bullants. He was delisted at the end of the season. Norman played a total of 27 games for Carlton over three seasons.

Following his AFL career, Norman returned to country Victoria, and to country football, playing with Mooroopna in the Goulburn Valley Football League from 2006-2007, then returning to Wangaratta Rovers for six seasons from 2008 until 2013; winning the best & fairest in 2012. He has played with Glenrowan since 2014, where he has played in their 2014, 2015, 2016 & 2017 premierships, with best on ground honours in 2014 & 2017 grand finals. He has won Glenrowan's best & fairest in 2014 & 2015.
