= Bert Clarke (footballer, born 1906) =

Australian rules footballer, born 1906

Personal information
- Full name: Albert Henry Clarke
- Born: 9 May 1906; Stratford, Victoria
- Died: 17 December 1974 (aged 68); Glenbrook, New South Wales
- Original teams: Albury, Corowa
- Height: 185 cm (6 ft 1 in)
- Weight: 82 kg (181 lb)

Playing career^{1}
Years	Club	Games (Goals)
1933	North Melbourne	4 (2)
- ^{1} Playing statistics correct to the end of 1933.

Albert Henry Clarke (9 May 1906 – 17 December 1974) was an Australian rules footballer who played for the North Melbourne Football Club in the Victorian Football League (VFL).

Clarke was recruited from Albury in the Ovens and Murray Football League.

Clarke played with Wangaratta in the Ovens & Murray Football League from 1937 to 1939.

Clarke played for Greta, then was captain coach of Milawa's 1940 premiership.

Clarke was later the President of the Ovens & King Football League from 1955 to 1957 and was made a life member in 1958.

Clarke later became a Life Member of the Osborne Football Club, in the Riverina, New South Wales.
