= Gary Holmes (footballer) =

Australian rules footballer (1938–2020)

Personal information
- Full name: Gary William Holmes
- Born: 2 January 1938
- Died: 25 September 2020 (aged 82); Myrtleford
- Original teams: Myrtleford, Wangaratta
- Height: 170 cm (5 ft 7 in)
- Weight: 73 kg (161 lb)
- Position: Rover

Playing career^{1}
Years	Club	Games (Goals)
1960–61	St Kilda	7 (2)
- ^{1} Playing statistics correct to the end of 1961.

Gary William Holmes (2 January 1938 – 25 September 2020) was an Australian rules footballer who played with St Kilda in the Victorian Football League (VFL).

Holmes played for Whorouly and King Valley in the Ovens and King Football League, kicking 144 goals between 1966 and 1973.

Holmes was captain-coach of King Valley in 1966 and 1967 and was runner up in the 1970 Ovens & King Football League's Baker Medal, then won it in 1971 and also his club's 1971 best and fairest when playing with King Valley Football Club.

Homes was a member of King Valley's 1970 Ovens and King Football League premiership team.

Holmes was later captain-coach of Whorouly Football Club in the Ovens & King Football League in 1972.
