= Les Gregory (footballer, born 1938) =

Australian rules footballer

Personal information
- Full name: Les Gregory
- Born: 12 June 1938
- Original team: Wangaratta Rovers
- Height: 179 cm (5 ft 10 in)
- Weight: 71 kg (157 lb)

Playing career^{1}
Years	Club	Games (Goals)
1959	St Kilda	3 (0)
- ^{1} Playing statistics correct to the end of 1959.

Les Gregory (born 12 June 1938) is a former Australian rules footballer who played with St Kilda in the Victorian Football League (VFL).
