= Ken Bodger =

Australian rules footballer (1924–1998)

Personal information
- Full name: Ken Bodger
- Born: 15 December 1924
- Died: 23 October 1998 (aged 73)
- Original team: Spring Road Methodists
- Height: 180 cm (5 ft 11 in)
- Weight: 81 kg (179 lb)

Playing career^{1}
Years	Club	Games (Goals)
1944–45	Hawthorn	12 (9)
1949	Sorrento	12 (0)
1950-51	Wangaratta Rovers	0 (0)
1952-53	Wangaratta	0 (0)
1954-56	Greta	0 (0)
- ^{1} Playing statistics correct to the end of 1945.

Ken Bodger (15 December 1924 – 23 October 1998) was an Australian rules footballer who played with Hawthorn in the Victorian Football League (VFL).

Bodger was captain-coach of Greta Football Club in the Ovens & King Football League from 1953 to 1956 and he kicked 10 goals in their 1954 winning grand final match.
