= Neil Ferguson (footballer) =

Australian rules footballer

Personal information
- Full name: Neil Graham Ferguson
- Born: 28 November 1945
- Died: 14 July 2016 (aged 70)
- Original team: Melbourne High School
- Height: 185 cm (6 ft 1 in)
- Weight: 86 kg (190 lb)

Playing career^{1}
Years	Club	Games (Goals)
1964–1970	Hawthorn	82 (50)
1971–1975	East Fremantle	86 (32)
1977	Claremont	16 (0)
- ^{1} Playing statistics correct to the end of 1977.

Neil Ferguson (28 November 1945 – 14 July 2016) was an Australian rules footballer who played with Hawthorn in the Victorian Football League (VFL).

Ferguson came to Hawthorn from Melbourne High School and was 18 when he made his VFL debut in 1964. He played as a ruckman but towards the end of his time at Hawthorn was also used to good effect up forward, kicking 19 goals in 1968 and 21 goals in 1969.

The second half of his football career was spent in Western Australia, with five years at East Fremantle and a season with Claremont. He was the first ruckman in East Fremantle's 1974 premiership winning side.

Ferguson died on 14 July 2016, aged 70.

Ferguson won the 1983 Ovens & King Football League best and fairest, the Baker Medal, when playing for the Bright Football Club.
