= Ron Black (footballer) =

Australian rules footballer, born 1908

Personal information
- Full name: Ronald Victor Black
- Born: 10 May 1908; Box Hill, Victoria
- Died: 3 October 1983 (aged 75); Melbourne, Victoria
- Original team: Box Hill Churches

Playing career^{1}
Years	Club	Games (Goals)
1927, 1929	Hawthorn	17 (0)
1930	Camberwell (VFA)	16 (0)
- ^{1} Playing statistics correct to the end of 1930.

Ronald Victor Black (10 May 1908 – 3 October 1983) was an Australian rules footballer who played with Hawthorn in the Victorian Football League (VFL).

== Early life ==
The son of Henry John Black (1862–1936) and Jane Ann Black (1869–1943), nee Armstrong, Ronald Victor Black was born at Box Hill in Victoria on 10 May 1908.

He was educated at Box Hill Grammar School.

== Football ==
In the Round 18 match against Richmond in 1927 at Punt Road, Black broke his leg when he collided with the boundary fence and missed the 1928 VFL football season while recovering from the fracture.

Black played with Camberwell Football Club in 1930.

Black won the 1932 and 1935 Ovens and King Football League's best and fairest award, the Charles Butler Medal, when playing for the Whorouly Football Club. He was also runner up in the same award in 1936.

== Cricket ==
Black played for Whorouly Cricket Club in the Myrtleford & District Cricket Association and made 113 in February, 1934.
