= Ovens & King Football League =

Sports league in Australia

Ovens & King Football Netball League
- Current season, competition or edition: 2026
- Formerly: Ovens And King Football Association
- Association: AFL Victoria Country (2012–present); Netball Victoria (1956–present)
- Founded: 13 June 1903; 123 years ago
- General manager: Daniel Saville
- Sports fielded: Australian rules football Netball
- Most titles: Moyhu (18)
- Current premiers: Whorouly (8)
- Website: O&KFNL website

The Ovens & King Football Netball League (OKFNL) is an Australian rules football and netball competition based in north-eastern Victoria around the regional cities of Benalla and Wangaratta. The league was formed in June 1903 as the Ovens & King Football Association.

== History ==
The Ovens & King Football League (OKFL) was formed on Saturday, 13 June 1903 after a handful of men met at The Bulls Head Hotel in Wangaratta to consider forming an Australian Rules Football competition. One week later, the first matches of the Ovens & King Football Association were played.

The competition changed its name to the Ovens and King Football League after the 1928 season.

Today, more than 100 years later, teams from Benalla, Bright, Greta, King Valley, Milawa, Moyhu, North Wangaratta, Tarrawingee and Whorouly participate in seniors, reserves and five netball grades.

Located in the Ovens Valley and King Valley of northeast Victoria, the league has produced a number of elite football players who have gone on to play in the AFL, including the cousins Nigel (Brisbane Lions) and Matthew Lappin (St Kilda/Carlton), ruckman Mark Porter (Kangaroos/Carlton) and most recently Michael Newton (Melbourne), Ben Reid (Collingwood) and Sam Reid (Sydney Swans).

Community support is strong in the Ovens and King districts with crowds attending games usually greater than most neighbouring competitions. The local football is an important social outlet for many local communities and finals matches draw especially strong crowd numbers.

In 2010, the league added Tatong, Swanpool, Goorambat and Bonnie Doon, who had previously played in the now-defunct Benalla & District Football League. After four years of heavy losses, Swanpool and Tatong were thrown out of the competition by AFL County Victoria, ending nearly 100 years of tradition. A two-way merge proposed by the clubs was rejected, as was a transfer to the Picola District FL.

In 2019 Glenrowan were forced into recess following a player, coach and volunteer shortage.

=== Names history ===
Period	Name
1903–1922	Ovens & King Football Association
1922–1924	Wangaratta & District Football Association
1925–1955	Ovens & King Football League
1956–present	Ovens & King Football Netball League

== Clubs ==
=== Locations ===
Locations of the Ovens & King FNL clubs

=== Current ===
Club	Colours	Nickname	Home Ground	Former League	Est.	Years in O&K	O&K Senior Premierships	
Club	Colours	Nickname	Home Ground	Former League	Est.	Years in O&K	Total	Years
Benalla All Blacks		Panthers	Friendlies Oval, Benalla	CGFL	1934	2005-	1	2022
Bonnie Doon		Bombers	Bonnie Doon Recreation Reserve, Bonnie Doon	BDFNL	1885	2010-	1	2023
Bright		Mountain Men	Pioneer Park, Bright	Y&DFL	1913	1955-	5	1986, 1987, 1992, 2004, 2025
Goorambat		Bats	Goorambat Recreation Reserve, Goorambat	BDFNL	1893	2010-	0	-
Greta		Blues	Greta Recreation Reserve, Hansonville	BDFNL	1901	1945-	10	1946, 1954, 1965, 1966, 1967, 1980, 1993, 1995, 1999, 2024
King Valley United		Kangaroos	Whitfield Recreation Reserve, Whitfield	–	1935	1935-	2	1970, 1981
Milawa		Demons	Milawa Recreation Reserve, Milawa	W&DFA	1903	1903-1921, 1925-	11	1923, 1924, 1927, 1940, 1969, 1984, 1985, 1991, 2009, 2013, 2019
Moyhu		Hoppers	Moyhu Recreation Reserve, Moyhu	W&DFA	1891	1903-1922, 1925-	18	1904, 1909, 1910, 1911, 1929, 1930, 1933, 1934, 1947, 1959, 1960, 1962, 1988, 2002, 2003, 2005, 2006, 2011
North Wangaratta		Hawks	North Wangaratta Sports Reserve, North Wangaratta	W&DFA, BDFNL	1892	1919-1920, 1929-1930, 1961-	4	1973, 1976, 1997, 2012
Tarrawingee		Bulldogs	Tarrawingee Recreation Reserve, Tarrawingee	W&DFA	1903	1903-1921, 1925-	8	1953, 1963, 1964, 1975, 1990, 2008, 2010, 2018
Whorouly		Lions	Whorouly Recreation Reserve, Whorouly	–	1892	1904-	8	1925, 1926, 1952, 1977, 1978, 1989, 2007, 2026

=== Former ===
Club	Colours	Nickname	Home Ground	Former League	Est.	Years in O&K	O&K Senior Premierships		Fate
Club	Colours	Nickname	Home Ground	Former League	Est.	Years in O&K	Total	Years	Fate
Beechworth (Beechworth United 1936-40)		Bombers	Baarmutha Park, Beechworth	OMFNL	1861	1912–1922, 1929–2003	14	1912, 1913, 1914, 1937, 1938, 1939, 1950, 1951, 1956, 1961, 1974, 1979, 2000, 2001	Moved to Tallangatta & District FL in 2004
Bogong		Tigers	Bogong Recreation Reserve, Bogong	Y&DFL	1946	1954–1959	1	1955	Moved to Tallangatta & District FL in 1960
Carboor				–	c.1900s	1903	0	-	Folded
Chiltern		Swans	Chiltern Recreation and Sports Reserve, Chiltern	C&DFA	c.1890s	1954–2002	10	1957, 1958, 1968, 1971, 1972, 1982, 1983, 1994, 1996, 1998	Moved to Tallangatta & District FL in 2003
Eldorado			Centennial Park, Eldorado	W&DFA	c.1890s	1905–1921, 1925–1954	6	1907; 1908, 1919, 1921, 1922, 1928	Folded in 1954
Everton				W&DFA	1919	1920–1921, 1925–1935	0	-	Folded in 1935
Gapsted			Gapsted Recreation Reserve, Gapsted	W&DFA	1919	1919, 1925–1926	0	-	1927-29 unknown. Played in Bright District FA in 1930
Glenrowan		Kelly Tigers	Glenrowan Recreation Reserve, Glenrowan	BDFNL	1919	1992–2019	4	2014, 2015, 2016, 2017	Folded in 2019
Myrtleford		Tigers	Memorial Park, Myrtleford	MBFL	1886	1927–1949	3	1936, 1945, 1949	Moved to Ovens & Murray FL in 1950
Peechelba				W&DFA	c.1920s	1922	0	-	Moved to Murray Valley North-East FL
Rutherglen		Cats	Barkly Park, Rutherglen	CDFL	1978	1992–2003	0	-	Moved to Tallangatta & District FL in 2004
South Wangaratta				–	1922	1922	0	-	Moved to Glenrowan and Thoona FA in 1923
Swanpool		Swans	Albert Heaney Oval, Swanpool	BDFNL	c.1920s	2010–2013	0	-	Forced into recess in 2014
Tatong		Magpies	Tatong Recreation Reserve, Tatong	BDFNL	c.1920s	2010–2013	0	-	Forced into recess in 2014
Wangaratta		Magpies	Norm Minns Oval, Wangaratta	OMFNL	1875	1903–1914, 1919-1921, 1931–1932, 1941	5	1905, 1906, 1920, 1931, 1932	Moved to Ovens & Murray FL in 1946
Wangaratta Rainbows	(1903-04)			–	1894	1903-1904, 1914-1915, 1941	2	1903, 1941	Merged back into Wangaratta
Wangaratta Rovers		Hawks	WJ Findlay Oval, Wangaratta	W&DFA	1922	1922–1930; 1945–1949	1	1948	Moved to Ovens & Murray FL in 1950
Wangaratta Waratahs				–	c.1920s	1933–1939	1	1935	Folded in 1940

== Premiership History ==
=== Senior Football Grand Finals ===
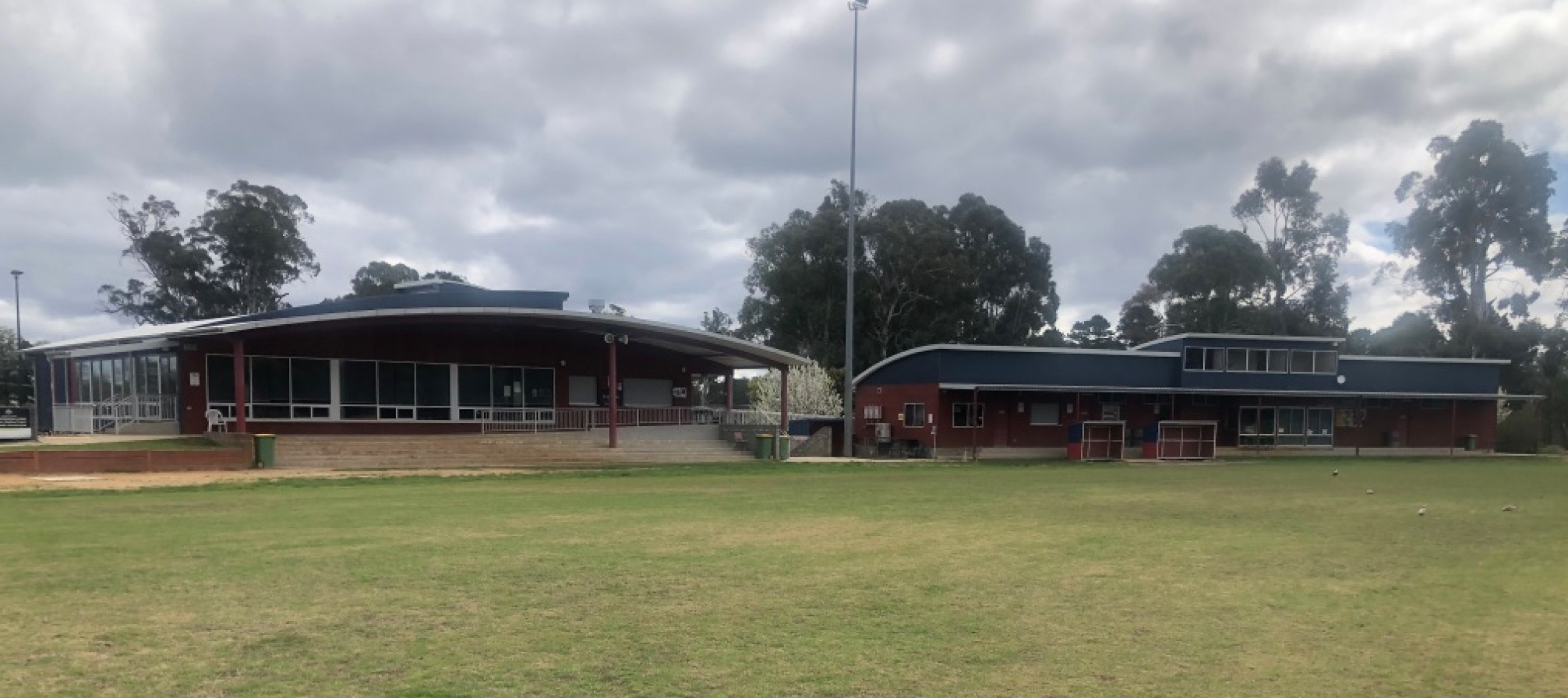
Beechworth Football Netball Clubrooms

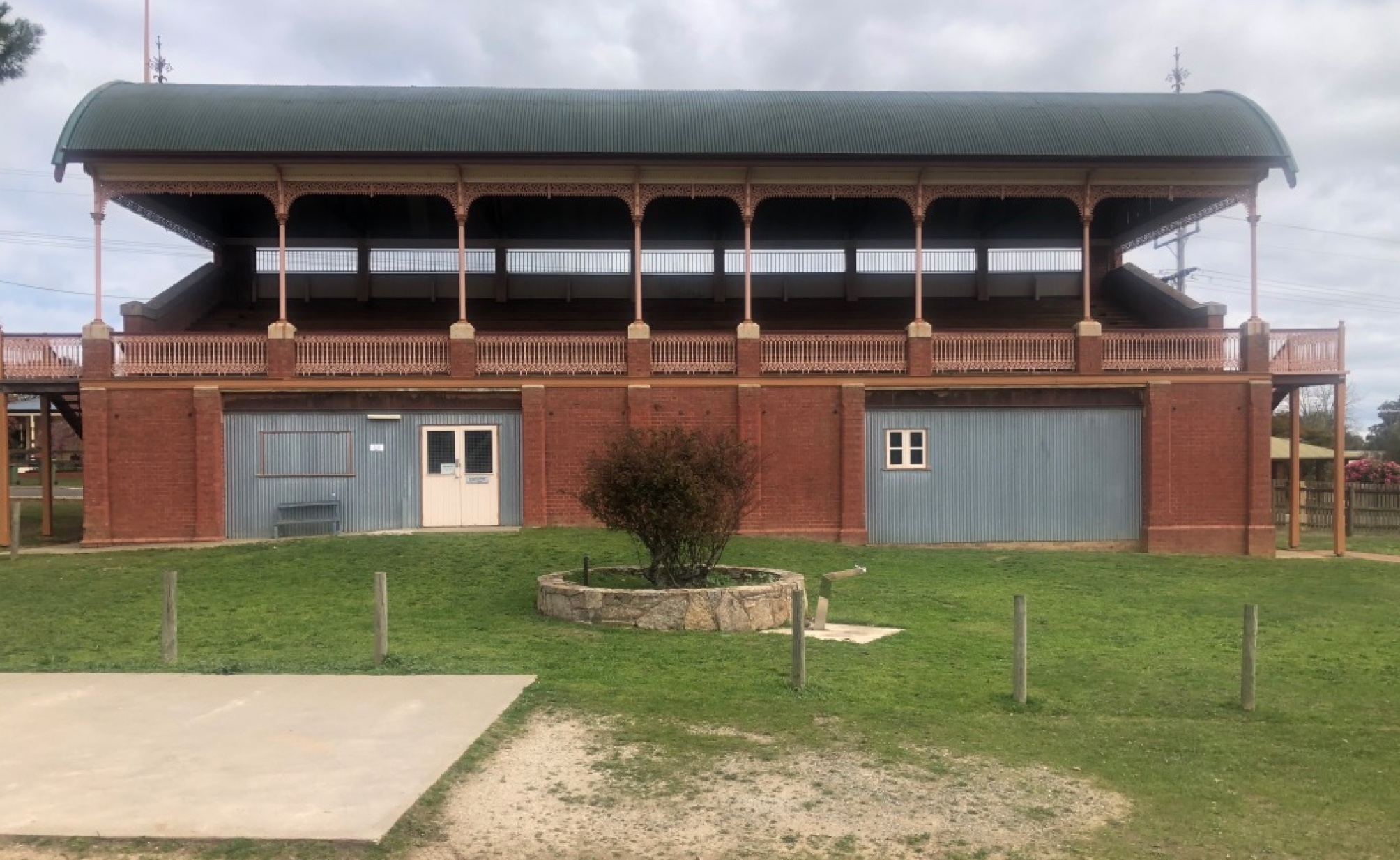
Baamutha Park Grandstand, Beechworth

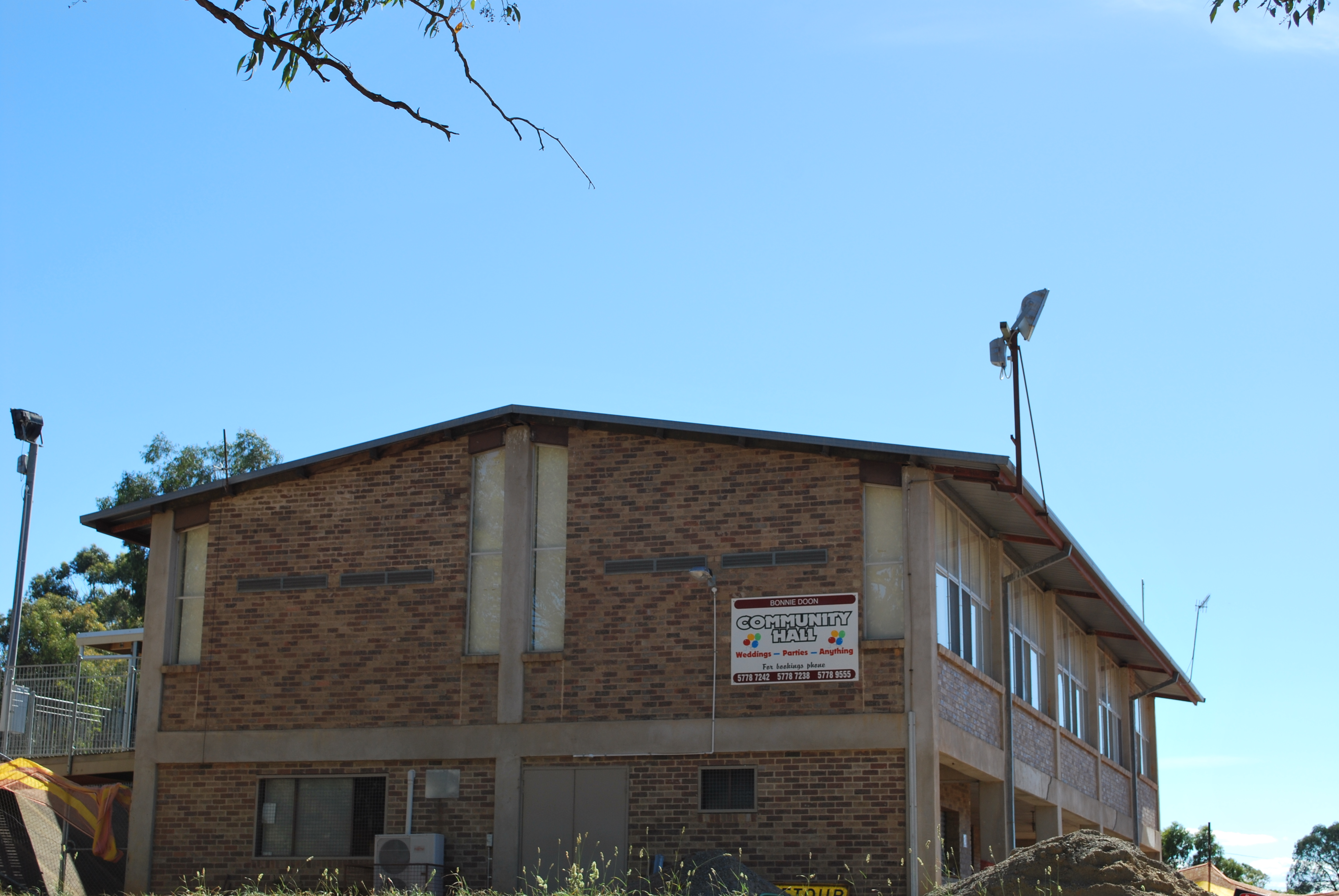
Bonnie Doon FNC Clubrooms

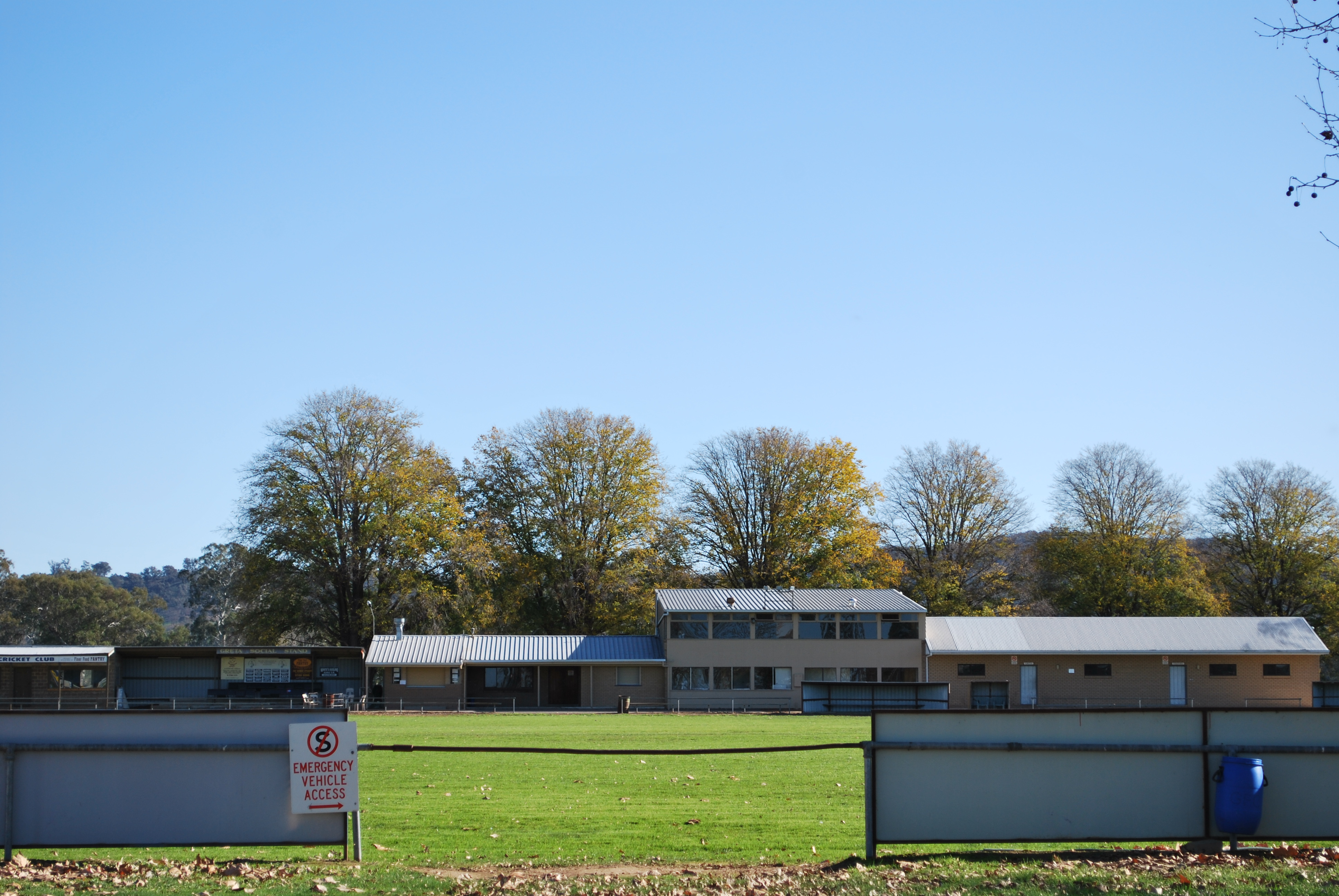
Greta Recreation Reserve

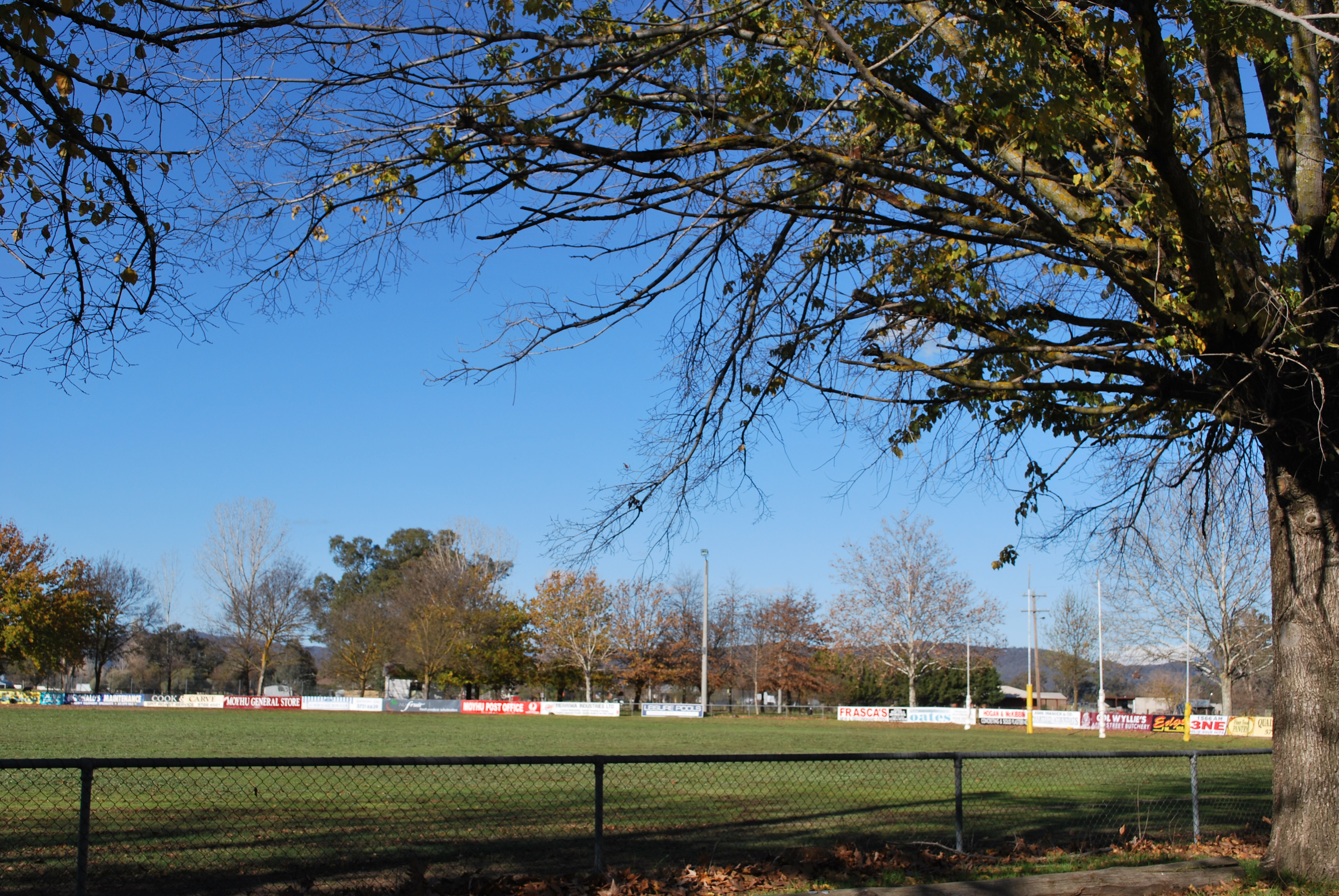
Moyhu Recreation Reserve

Year	Premier	G	B	Pts	Runner Up	G	B	Pts	Best on Ground	Coach	Venue	Gate	Comments
2026	Whorouly (8)	8	8	56	Bright	6	12	48			WJ Findlay Oval		
2025	Bright (5)	11	7	73	Greta	8	9	57	Cooper Thomason (B)	Michael Quirk	WJ Findlay Oval		
2024	Greta (10)	16	12	108	Bright	6	4	40	James McClounan (G)	Chris Dube	WJ Findlay Oval		
2023	Bonnie Doon (1)	8	8	56	Bright	6	2	38	Beau Smith (BD)	Ken Murray	WJ Findlay Oval		
2022	Benalla All Blacks (1)	8	12	60	Bonnie Doon	5	5	35	Jackson Hourigan (BAB)	Nick Spencer	WJ Findlay Oval		
2021	Season cancelled after 12 matches due to COVID-19 pandemic in Victoria												
	1st: Milawa				2nd: Tarrawingee								No finals series
2020	Season cancelled due to COVID-19 pandemic in Victoria												
2019	Milawa (12)	14	20	104	Bright	6	7	43	Jamie Allan (M)	Ricky Petts	WJ Findlay Oval		
2018	Tarrawingee (8)	9	7	61	Milawa	5	4	34	Daine Porter (T)	Trevor Edwards	WJ Findlay Oval		
2017	Glenrowan (4)	13	12	90	Benalla All Blacks	6	7	43	Karl Norman (G)	Nigel Robinson	WJ Findlay Oval		
2016	Glenrowan (3)	16	11	107	Tarrawingee	6	7	43	Luke Fox (G)	Nigel Robinson	WJ Findlay Oval		
2015	Glenrowan (2)	9	13	67	Milawa	8	6	54	Gus Gray (G)	Nigel Robinson	WJ Findlay Oval		
2014	Glenrowan (1)	16	13	109	Milawa	10	8	68	Karl Norman (G)	Nigel Robinson	WJ Findlay Oval		
2013	Milawa (11)	15	16	106	Glenrowan	7	3	45	Jack Stamp (M)	Mick Newton	WJ Findlay Oval		
2012	North Wangaratta (4)	20	10	130	Whorouly	12	11	83	Phil O'Keefe (NW)	David Steer	WJ Findlay Oval		
2011	Moyhu (18)	16	7	103	Tarrawingee	15	11	101	Ryan Craig (M)	John McNamara	WJ Findlay Oval		
2010	Tarrawingee (7)	15	9	99	Milawa	15	7	97	Jamie Bell (T)	Mick Wilson	Wang Showgrounds		
2009	Milawa (10)	14	7	91	Tarrawingee	12	10	82	Scott Pell (M)	Mick Newton	Wang Showgrounds		
2008	Tarrawingee (6)	14	10	94	Bright	8	11	59	Mick Everitt (T)	Mick Wilson	Wang Showgrounds		
2007	Whorouly (7)	14	13	97	Bright	12	6	78	Luke Matherson (W)	Scott McMaster	Wang Showgrounds		
2006	Moyhu (17)	19	13	127	Whorouly	10	15	75	Anthony Welsh (M)	Gil Ould	Wang Showgrounds		
2005	Moyhu (16)	15	8	98	Whorouly	12	16	88	Gerard Nolan (M)	Gil Ould	Wang Showgrounds		
2004	Bright (4)	13	10	88	Moyhu	12	12	84	Mark Riky (B)	Mark Dicketts	Tarrawingee		
2003	Moyhu (15)	25	10	160	North Wangaratta	15	6	96	Gerard Nolan (M)	Gil Ould	Tarrawingee		
2002	Moyhu (14)	20	10	130	Beechworth	15	11	101	Marcus Lloyd (M)	Des Smith	Tarrawingee		
2001	Beechworth (14)	20	7	127	North Wangaratta	15	8	98	Mal Boyd (B)	Micheal Quirk	Tarrawingee		
2000	Beechworth (13)	6	9	45	Moyhu	4	1	25	Des Smith (M)	Michael Quirk	Tarrawingee		
1999	Greta (9)	14	16	100	Moyhu	14	11	95	Scott Amery (G)	Mick Caruso	Tarrawingee		
1998	Chiltern (10)	18	8	116	Bright	12	18	90	Michael Murphy (C)	Payl Twycross	Tarrawingee		
1997	North Wangaratta (3)	22	14	146	Greta	8	14	62	Leigh Miller (NW)	Gary O'Keefe	Tarrawingee		
1996	Chiltern (9)	14	20	104	North Wangaratta	10	11	71	Damian Prentice (C)	Ralph Albers	Tarrawingee		
1995	Greta (8)	14	16	100	Beechworth	10	16	76	Darren Waite (G)	Rob Richards	Tarrawingee		
1994	Chiltern (8)	19	18	132	North Wangaratta	10	12	72	Mark Johnson (C)	Ralph Albers	Tarrawingee		
1993	Greta (7)	19	13	127	Chiltern	9	7	61	Anthony Foubister (G)	Rod Canny	Tarrawingee		
1992	Bright (3)	10	14	74	Chiltern	9	13	67	Paul Dalbosco (B)	Ian Wales	Tarrawingee		
1991	Milawa (9)	19	10	124	Greta	18	11	119	Brendan Allan (M)	Brendan Allan	Tarrawingee		
1990	Tarrawingee (5)	27	11	173	Moyhu	15	12	102	Brian Judd (T)	Bob Barrett	Greta		
1990 onwards: Official Best on Ground recipient > VCFL Medal
1989	Whorouly (6)	13	16	94	Beechworth	13	7	85		Bill McMillan	Tarrawingee	$13,467	
1988	Moyhu (13)	12	13	85	Beechworth	11	13	79		Peter Hines	Tarrawingee		
1987	Bright (2)	20	11	131	Whorouly	14	8	92		Greg Taylor	Tarrawingee	$11,786	
1986	Bright (1)	10	11	71	Greta	9	12	66		Greg Taylor	Tarrawingee		
1985	Milawa (8)	18	20	128	Bright	7	18	60		Jeff Clarke	Tarrawingee	$11,038	
1984	Milawa (7)	18	11	119	Chiltern	5	11	41		Jeff Clarke	Tarrawingee		
1983	Chiltern (7)	16	12	108	Beechworth	14	12	96		Terry Smith	Tarrawingee		
1982	Chiltern (6)	26	14	170	Milawa	15	6	96		John Clancy	Tarrawingee	$7,100	
1981	King Valley (2)	15	14	104	Milawa	10	15	75		Ritchie Allen	Moyhu	$4900	
1980	Greta (6)	16	15	111	Whorouly	13	6	84		Geoff Lacey	Moyhu		
1979	Beechworth (12)	19	17	131	Whorouly	12	10	82		Rob Forrest	Milawa	$4350	
1978	Whorouly (5)	25	25	175	Beechworth	8	7	55		Norm Bussell	Moyhu	$2600	
1977	Whorouly (4)	15	17	107	North Wangaratta	14	9	93		Norm Bussell	Milawa		
1976	North Wangaratta (2)	22	16	148	Beechworth	7	11	53		Des Sheridan	Milawa		
1975	Tarrawingee (4)	15	8	98	Beechworth	11	16	82		John Welch	Whorouly	$1570	
1974	Beechworth (11)	15	13	103	North Wangaratta	9	5	59		Mick Brenia	Chiltern	$1536	
1973	North Wangaratta (1)	16	17	113	Chiltern	13	8	86		Len Greskie	Milawa	$1095	
1972	Chiltern (5)	11	12	78	Beechworth	8	12	60		Peter Rosenbrock	Milawa	?	
1971	Chiltern (4)	13	7	85	Milawa	11	13	79		Brian O'Brien	Tarrawingee	$966	
1970	King Valley (1)	14	13	97	Milawa	7	9	51		Bob Atkinson	Moyhu	$1,100	
1969	Milawa (6)	14	17	101	Beechworth	13	7	85		Jay Comensoli	Moyhu	$1003	
1968	Chiltern (3)	12	8	80	Greta	11	12	78		Len Richards	Whorouly	$779	
1967	Greta (5)	13	10	88	Tarrawingee	8	7	55		Maurie Farrell	Milawa	$833	
1966	Greta (4)	6	15	51	King Valley	5	8	38		Maurie Farrell	Tarrawingee	$879	
1965	Greta (3)	5	11	41	Tarrawingee	4	15	39		Maurie Farrell	Beechworth	£420	
1964	Tarrawingee (3)	9	9	63	Greta	7	5	47		Ray Burns	Whorouly	£285	
1963	Tarrawingee (2)	7	18	60	Moyhu	9	5	59		Ray Burns	Chiltern	£370	
1962	Moyhu (12)	9	9	63	Tarrawingee	3	12	30		Ray Burns	Beechworth	£286	
1961	Beechworth (10)	14	13	97	Greta	12	12	84		Bill Comensoli	Tarrawingee	£532	
1960	Moyhu (11)	9	11	65	Beechworth	9	5	59		Ron Murray	Tarrawingee	£362	
1959	Moyhu (10)	9	7	61	Chiltern	6	10	46		Arthur Smith	Whorouly	£272	
1958	Chiltern (2)	9	6	60	Greta	8	6	54		Greg Tate	Tarrawingee	£243	
1957	Chiltern (1)	14	14	98	King Valley	7	12	54		Greg Tate	Tarrawingee	£603	
1956	Beechworth (9)	9	17	71	Milawa	6	5	41		Tim Lowe	Tarrawingee	£274	
1955	Bogong (1)	6	12	48	Beechworth	5	16	46		Vic Donald	Tarrawingee	£272	
1954	Greta (2)	14	12	96	Chiltern	13	14	92		Ken Bodger	Tarrawingee	£483	
1953	Tarrawingee (1)	14	11	95	Greta	7	10	52		Kevin French	Whorouly	£354	
1952	Whorouly (3)	11	19	85	Wangaratta	12	11	83		Rex Bennett	Milawa	£174	
1951	Beechworth (8)	14	11	95	Whorouly	13	16	94		Ern Guppy	Milawa	£193	
1950	Beechworth (7)	15	12	102	Whorouly	9	17	71		Jim Reilly	Milawa	£152	
1949	Myrtleford (3)	16	9	105	Wangaratta Rovers	9	14	68		Tom Maguire	Whorouly	£133	
1948	Wangaratta Rovers (1)	13	15	93	Myrtleford	10	13	73		Len Hill	Whorouly	£172	
1947	Moyhu (9)	14	9	93	Milawa	11	22	88		Ben Ward	Whorouly	£185	
1946	Greta (1)	8	5	53	Myrtleford	2	14	26		Laurie Nash & Fred O'Brien	Whorouly	£132	
1945	Myrtleford (2)	17	15	117	Milawa	12	21	93		Len Ablett	Whorouly	£62	
1944	O&KFA was in recess due to World War II												
1943	O&KFA was in recess due to World War II												
1942	O&KFA was in recess due to World War II												
1941	Rainbows (2)	16	13	109	Wangaratta	7	17	59		Ernie Ward	Wang Cricket Ground	£19	
1940	Milawa (5)	14	18	102	Beechworth	15	8	98		Bert Clarke	Milawa	£34	
1939	Beechworth (6)	15	13	103	Waratahs	8	9	57		Ern Guppy	Whorouly	£63	
1938	Beechworth (5)	15	7	97	Myrtleford	10	16	76		Doug Haig	Milawa	£82	
1937	Beechworth (4)	9	23	77	Myrtleford	5	11	41		Jack Flanigan	Whorouly	£126	
1936	Myrtleford (1)	10	15	75	Whorouly	9	8	62		Dr C E Beaumont	Beechworth	£100	
1935	Waratahs (1)	13	17	95	Myrtleford	12	12	84		Arthur Mills	Whorouly	£98	
1934	Moyhu (8)	9	15	69	Myrtleford	7	14	56		Ben Ward	Whorouly	£84	
1933	Moyhu (7)	12	17	89	Myrtleford	8	9	57		Ben Ward	Beechworth	£95	
1932	Wangaratta (5)	14	19	103	Whorouly	7	12	54		Fred Carey	Milawa	£80	
1931	Wangaratta (4)	11	13	79	Moyhu	8	9	57		Fred Carey	North Wangaratta	£140	
1930	Moyhu (6)	8	16	64	Beechworth	5	12	42		Ben Ward	Whorouly	£95	
1929	Moyhu (5)	10	16	76	Myrtleford	10	14	74		Ben Ward	Milawa	£62	
1928	Eldorado (6)	10	17	77	Milawa	7	14	56		David Methven	Wang Cricket Ground	£60	
1927	Milawa (4)	11	12	78	Whorouly	10	7	67		Noel Skehan	Wang Cricket Ground	£52	
1926	Whorouly* (2)	9	7	61	Moyhu	6	13	49		Eddie Spink	Whorouly	£36	*Premiership withdrawn
1925	Whorouly (1)	9	13	67	Milawa	6	6	42		Eddie Spink	Wang Cricket Ground	£37	
1924	Milawa (3)	11	13	79	Moyhu	4	10	34		George Ferguson	Wang Cricket Ground		Wang & DFA
1923	Milawa (2)	9	7	61	Wangaratta Rovers	8	11	59		George Ferguson	Milawa		Wang & DFA
1922	Milawa (1)	9	12	66	Wangaratta Rovers	4	10	34		George Ferguson	Wang Cricket Ground	£35	Wang & DFA
1922	Eldorado (5)	5	15	45	Whorouly	5	10	40		H Stafford	Beechworth	£28	O&KFA
1921	Eldorado (4)	9	6	60	Wangaratta	5	7	37		H Stafford	Wangaratta	£107	
1920	Wangaratta (3)	10	11	71	Eldorado	8	14	62		R J Metcalfe	Wangaratta	£74	
1919	Eldorado (3)	5	18	48	Wangaratta	0	6	6			Wangaratta	£65	
1918	Suspended during World War I												
1917	Suspended during World War I												
1916	Suspended during World War I												
1915	O&KFA season abandoned after round eight > World War I												
1914	Beechworth (3)	7	7	49	Moyhu	6	8	44		Bill Marchbank	Wangaratta	£17	
1913	Beechworth (2)	10	14	74	Moyhu	8	17	65		H W Walker	Wangaratta	£29	
1912	Beechworth (1)	12	6	78	Moyhu	5	13	43		H W Walker	Wangaratta	£35	
1911	Moyhu (4)	11	14	80	Beechworth	6	10	46		Tom Simmonds	Milawa	£23	
1910	Moyhu (3)	8	8	56	Wangaratta	6	13	49		Tom Simmonds	Milawa	£14	
1909	Moyhu (2)	7	9	51	Wangaratta	3	11	29	< S Final match	Tom Simmonds	Milawa	£10	No G Final played
1908	Eldorado (2)	4	7	31	Wangaratta	3	11	29					
1907	Eldorado (1)	6	14	50	Milawa	4	7	31					
1906	Wangaratta (2)				Beechworth								
1905	Wangaratta (1)	6	5	41	Whorouly	3	14	32					
1904	Moyhu (1)				Moyhu								
1903	Rainbows (1)				Milawa								

=== A Grade Netball Grand Finals ===
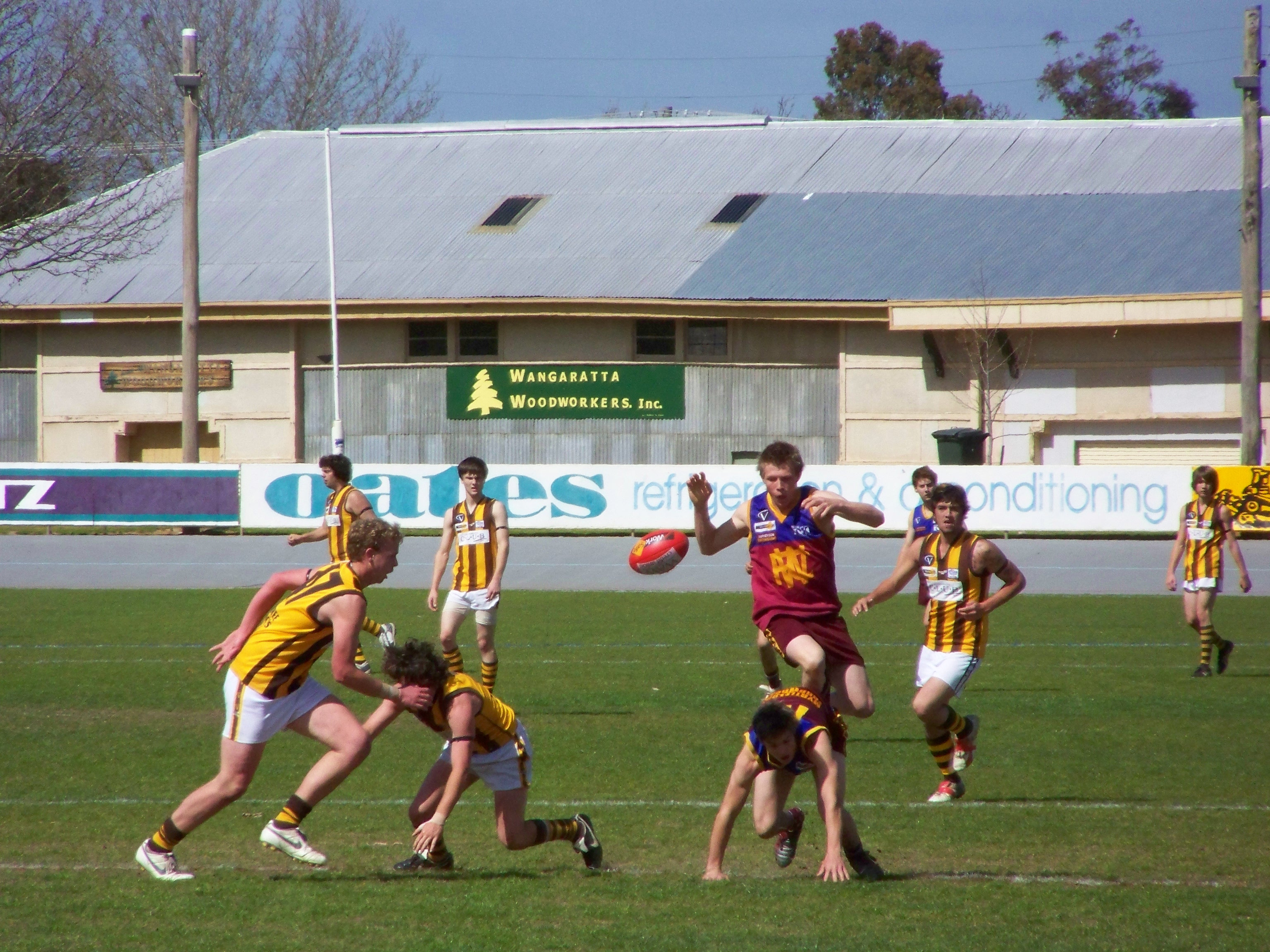
O&K 2007 Thirds Grand Final between Whorouly and North Wangaratta

Year	Premier	Score	Runner Up	Score
2025	Bonnie Doon (2)	53	Whorouly	50
2024	Bonnie Doon (1)		Greta	
2023	Greta (27)	52	Milawa	44
2022	Greta (26)	41	Milawa	40
2021	Milawa*	1st	Greta	2nd
2020	Season cancelled due to COVID-19 pandemic in Victoria			
2019	Greta (25)	47	Milawa	42
2018	Greta (24)	59	Milawa	48
2017	Greta (23)	43	King Valley	41
2016	King Valley (2)	40	Milawa	39
2015	King Valley (1)	39	Milawa	32
2014	Tarrawingee (5)	46	King Valley	42
2013	Milawa (3)	50	Greta	42
2012	Greta (22)	50	Whorouly	44
2011	Whorouly (8)	49	Greta	48
2010	Greta (21)	41	Whorouly	39
2009	Tarrawingee (4)	52	Moyhu	47
2008	Milawa (2)	41	Moyhu	40
2007	Moyhu (13)	63	North Wangaratta	34
2006	Moyhu (12)	54	North Wangaratta	45
2005	Moyhu (11)	65	Whorouly	39
2004	Glenrowan (1)	54	Moyhu	52
2003	Moyhu (10)	64	Milawa	43
2002	Moyhu (9)	56	Glenrowan	41
2001	Moyhu (8)	76	Whorouly	50
2000	Moyhu (7)		King Valley	
1999	Greta (20)	69	Milawa	40
1998	Greta (19)	51	Milawa	48
1997	Whorouly (7)	58	Milawa	49
1996	Whorouly (6)	45	Greta	34
1995	Greta (18)	51	Milawa	37
1994	Greta (17)	50	Whorouly	40
1993	Greta (16)	46	Whorouly	45
1992	Greta (15)	56	Chiltern	35
1991	Greta (14)	52	Tarrawingee	44
1990	Moyhu (6)	54	Chiltern	43
1989	Greta (13)	49	Chiltern	24
1988	Greta (12)	38	Tarrawingee	29
1987	Greta (11)		Tarrawingee	
1986	Greta (10)	44	Tarrawingee	34
1985	Greta (9)		Chiltern	
1984	Whorouly (5)	25	Tarrawingee	18
1983	Whorouly (4)	45	North Wangaratta	36
1982	North Wangaratta (4)	42	Tarrawingee	32
1981	North Wangaratta (3)		Whorouly	
1980	North Wangaratta (2)		Greta	
1979	North Wangaratta (1)	29	Greta	25
1978	Greta (8)	26	North Wangaratta	16
1977	Greta (7)		Tarrawingee	
1976	Greta (6)		Beechworth	
1975	Chiltern (3)		Beechworth	
1974	Chiltern (2)	26	King Valley	23
1973	Chiltern (1)	24	King Valley	17
1972	Tarrawingee (3)	41	Chiltern	39
1971	Moyhu (5)	31	Chiltern	23
1970	Whorouly (3)		Moyhu	
1969	Whorouly (2)	24	Moyhu	23
1968	Moyhu (4)	33	Whorouly	32
1967	Whorouly (1)		Moyhu	
1966	Moyhu (3)	25	Tarrawingee	23
1965	Moyhu (2)	29	Tarrawingee	28
1964	Greta (5)	40	Moyhu	25
1963	Greta (4)	40	Tarrawingee	30
1962	Greta (3)		Moyhu	
1961	Moyhu (1)	37	Greta	33
1960	Greta (2)	27	Tarrawingee	18
1959	Greta (1)		Tarrawingee	
1958	Tarrawingee (2)			
1957	Tarrawingee (1)	19	Moyhu	15
1956	Milawa (1)		Moyhu	

- 2021 - Minor Premiership awarded. 12 matches played, but no finals played due to COVID-19

== League Hall Of Fame ==
This prestigious honour for O&KFNL players & officials was first awarded in 2006.

- 2006: Ray Burns, Clyde Baker, Clem Goonan, Mick Nolan, Richie Shanley, Jim Skinns, Lionel Wallace.
- 2007: Ray Price, Vin Shelley, Ken Stewart.
- 2008: Fay Morgan, Fred Baker, Allan Dickson, Kevin Allen.
- 2009: Fred Jensen.
- 2010: Daryl Everitt, Neville Pollard, Laurie Stewart.
- 2011: Norm Bussell, Bob Comensoli, Kath Dobson, Max Newth.
- 2012: Brendan Allan, Mark Allan, Jeff Clarke.
- 2013: Ken Ellis, Gladys Townsend, Dawn Wallace, Rex Walter.
- 2014: Des Sheridan.
- 2015: Scott Douglas, Robyn Hogan, Wendy Hogan, Jock Lappin.
- 2016:
- 2017:
- 2018: Mal Dinsdale, Lionel Schutt, Kevin Rhodes, Gerard Nolan
- 2019:
- 2020: O&K in recess due to COVID-19
- 2021:
- 2022: Chris Donald, Paul Hickey, Chris O'Keefe
- 2023:
- 2024: Paul Hogan
- 2025:
- 2026: Jock Gardner

== League Life Members ==
Charlie H. Butler (Sec)

G. Ray Barker (Pres)

Ron Marks (Tribunal)

John Keogh (Auditor)

Cyril C. Johnson (Tribunal)

Harold H. Wellington (Tribunal)

Bert H.G. Harman (Reporter)

J R Mummery (Delegate)

William Smith (Sponsor etc.)

Clyde Baker (Sec)

Albert (Bert) A. Clarke (Pres)

Jack M. Wood (Tribunal)

D.P. Jones (Auditor)

H. Peter Nolan (Pres)

Ken Stewart (Delegate)

Angry J.A. Ferguson (Auditor)

Fred Jensen (Delegate)

E.J (Ted) Lester (Delegate)

Fred Baker (Sec)

Vin Shelley (Pres)

D.R. (Toby) Schultz (Tribunal)

Les O`Keefe (Tribunal)

Bill Lowen (300 games) Bright

William "Bill" O`Brien (300 games) Greta

Rob Forrest (300 games) Beechworth

John "Rowdy" Lappin (300 games) Chiltern

Rex Walter (300 games) North Wangaratta

Ross Nightingale (300 games) Bright

Gary Bussell (300 games) King Valley

Trevor Blair (300 games) Tarrawingee

Mark Allan (300 games) Milawa

Brendan Allan (300 games) Milawa

Lionel Schutt (300 games) Milawa, North Wang, Tarrawingee, Moyhu

Allan Dickson (League President)

Andrew Smith (300 games) Greta, Glenrowan

Mal Dinsdale (400 games) Tarrawingee

Geoff Robinson (400 games) Milawa

Russell Ferguson (400 games) Milawa

Steve Masin (300 games) Whorouly

Peter Hawkins (400 games) Moyhu

Bruce Nightingale (300 games)

Alan "Ab" Gillett (300 games) Bright

John Munari Moyhu

Patrick O'Shea (Bright)

Peter Jones (Bright)

Scott Douglas (Moyhu)

Robert Burrowes (Moyhu, King Valley)

Paul Hogan (Greta)

== Senior Football Best and Fairest / Clyde Baker Medal Winners ==
Seniors:	O&KFNL Senior Football - Best & Fairest					
Year	Winner	Club	Votes	Second	Club	Votes
John Hughes Medal
1932	Ron Black	Whorouly		?		
1933	Keith Parris	Beechworth	15	V Lloyd	Milawa	14
Charles H. Butler Medal
1934	Arthur Mills	Waratahs	4	Ron Reah	Moyhu	3
1935	Ron Black	Whorouly	?	Arthur Mills	Waratahs	?
1936	Jack Parish	Eldorado	24	Len Ablett &	Myrtleford	16
				Ron Black &	Whorouly	16
				Frank Hill	Myrtleford	16
1937	Maurie Valli	Milawa	19	Len Jordon &	Eldorado	14
				A MacDonnell	King Valley	14
1938	Ron Reah	Moyhu	27	R Mullenger	Beechworth	26
1939	Ron Reah	Moyhu	14	J Smith &	Beechworth	9
				Len Hill	Waratahs	9
Charles H. Butler withdraws medal donation
1940	Was there a medal?					
R. H. Ross Trophy
1941	Lionel Wallace	Moyhu	?	Ernie Ward	Rainbows	
1942-4	O&K in recess	World War 2				
Harry West Medal
1945	Who won?					
1946	Jock Gardner	Milawa	13	Lionel Wallace	Greta	11
1947	Jock Gardner	Milawa	19&1/2	Lionel Wallace	Greta	17
				Jack Sullivan	Tarrawingee	17
L Donnolly Medal
1948	Ian Thomas	King Valley	17	Lionel Wallace	Greta	15
John "Jack" Arthur Bynon Trophy
1949	Jack Sullivan	Tarrawingee	18	Lionel Wallace	Greta	16
1950	A "Mick" Jess	Whorouly	9	Jock Gardner	Milawa	8
	Jack Sullivan*	Tarrawingee	(9)	Ken Newth	Greta	8
1951	Jock Gardner	Milawa	12	Bryan Martin	Moyhu	11&1/2
1952	Doug Ferguson	Eldorado	14	Kevin Mauger	Whorouly	10
1953	Ray Warford	Moyhu	16	Ken Newth	Greta	9
1954	Tim Lowe	Beechworth	18	Ray Warford	Moyhu	14
1955	Ray Warford	Moyhu	14	Ken Nish	Tarrawingee	12
Tip Lean Trophy
1956	Ray Warford &	Tarrawingee	10	Vic Donald	Bogong	9&1/2
	Greg Hogan * &	Moyhu	10			
	Tim Lowe *	Beechworth	10			
1957	Bill Pinder	Beechworth	15	Bill Moorman	Bogong	13
1958	Clem Goonan	Whorouly	11	Bill Pinder	King Valley	10
1959	Ken Spink	Whorouly	15	Rex Allen &	Milawa	10
				Ted Faithful	Bogong	10
1960	Colin Barnes	Greta	22	Bill Comensoli	Beechworth	11
1961	Colin Barnes	Greta	15&1/2	John Hayes	Chiltern	10
1962	Ken Dixon	Chiltern	16	Geoff Lack	Tarrawingee	13
1963	Ron Critchley	Whorouly	14	Bill Comensoli	Beechworth	12
1964	Eddie Hooper	Greta	15	Bill Comensoli	Beechworth	14
1965	Bob Comensoli	Moyhu	14	Max Newth	Greta	10
				Roly Marklew	Tarrawingee	10
1966	Les Butler	Bright	11	Trevor Kennett	Milawa	10
				Mick Tanner	Greta	10
Total Petrol Agents Trophy
1967	Bob Comensoli	Moyhu	21	Dale Walker	Bright	18
Clyde Baker Medal
1968	Bill McAuliffe	Whorouly	22	Mick Tanner	Greta	17
1969	Alan McDonald	Moyhu	21	Ron Burridge	Beechworth	17
1970	Stuart Elkington	Whorouly	18	Bob Barker	Milawa	16
				Gary Holmes	King Valley	16
1971	Gary Holmes	King Valley	16	Barry Newth	Greta	15
	John Lappin *	Chiltern	16			
1972	Mick Lloyd	Moyhu	21	John Lappin	Chiltern	20
1973	Eddie Flynn	North Wang	20	John Lappin	Chiltern	18
1974	John Lappin	Chiltern	29	Alan Jarrott	Moyhu	28
1975	Rob Parolin	Whorouly	21	Terry Flynn	North Wang	16
				John Lappin	Chiltern	16
1976	Vic Christou	King Valley	18	Geoff Lacey	Greta	16
1977	John Rutten	Beechworth	24	Norm Bussell	Whorouly	17
1978	Neville Pollard	Milawa	21	Mick Lloyd	Whorouly	15
	John Lappin *	Chiltern	21	Wayne Dickson	King Valley	15
	Terry Wadley *	Greta	21			
1979	Con Madden	Beechworth	27	John Lappin	Chiltern	26
1980	Neville Pollard	Milawa	20	Geoff Lacey	Greta	19
1981	Richie Allen	King Valley	24	John Chitty	Whorouly	21
1982	John Lappin	Chiltern	30	John Chitty &	Whorouly	24
				Geoff Lacey	Greta	24
1983	Neale McMonigle &	North Wang	23	John Chitty	Whorouly	20
	Neil Ferguson	Bright	23	Con Madden	Beechworth	20
1984	Geoff Lacey &	Greta	27	Neville Allan	Milawa	18
	Greg Taylor	Bright	27	Daryl Everitt	Tarrawingee	18
				Con Madden	Beechworth	18
1985	Con Madden	Beechworth	22	Mark Stevens	Chiltern	18
1986	Peter Duncan	Whorouly	22	Bill Quirk	Bright	21
1987	Mark Ottrey	Moyhu	16	Bill Quirk &	Bright	15
				Jeff Ramsdale	Beechworth	15
1988	Tony Gleeson	Greta	18	Mick Craig &	Beechworth	17
				David Ryan	Moyhu	17
1989	Peter Lappin	Chiltern	24	Brendan Allan	Milawa	22
1990	Tony Gleeson	Greta	27	Noel Long &	Tarrawingee	20
				Laurie Parolin	Whorouly	20
1991	Fred Pane	North Wang	32	Brendan Allan	Milawa	19
1992	Laurie Larsen	Whorouly	30	Wayne Schulz	Corowa/Rutherglen	23
1993	Mark Johns	North Wang	24	Chris Jensen	Beechworth	22
1994	Mark Porter	King Valley	?	Ralph Albers	Chiltern	?
1995	Paul Hogan	Greta	21	Mark Kilner	Greta	20
				Shane Lockyer	Glenrowan	20
				David Ryan	North Wang	20
1996	Tony Gayfer	Corowa/Rutherglen		?		
1997	Des Smith	Moyhu	30	James Hodgkins	Chiltern	28
1998	Colin McClonnan	Whorouly	31	Des Smith	Moyhu	28
1999	Rod Milthorpe	Corowa/Rutherglen	22	Brad Miller	North Wang	20
2000	Shane Driscoll	North Wang	26	Scott Francis	Corowa/Rutherglen	23
2001	Scott Francis &	Corowa/Rutherglen	19	Mark Scholte	Glenrowan	18
	Anthony Milheljevic	Beechworth	19			
2002	Adam Clark &	Tarrawingee	24	Finton Eames	Tarrawingee	20
	John Allen	Beechworth	24			
2003	Ty Baxter	Bright	20	Darren Gephart	Moyhu	18
2004	Stuart Cooper	King Valley	21	Adam Clark	Tarrawingee	19
2005	Richard Bull	Milawa	34	Paul Glanville &	Whorouly	24
				Brad Miller	North Wang	24
2006	Tom Hazell	Greta	21	Nigel Robinson	King Valley	20
2007	Anthony Welsh	Moyhu	33	Matt Kelly	Bright	31
2008	Finton Eames &	Tarrawingee	23	Steve Nightingdale	Bright	22
	Matt Kelly	Bright	23			
2009	Steve Nightingdale	Bright	23	Jono Rea	King Valley	22
2010	Steve Nightingdale	Bright	29	Richard Bull	Ben All Blacks	22
2011	Nathan Waite	Moyhu	21	Jaimon McGeehan	Moyhu	19
2012	Adam Williams	King Valley	25	Daryl Webb	Ben All Blacks	24
2013	Adam Williams	King Valley	27	Ryan Kent	Bright	22
				Jack Stamp	Milawa	22
2014	Daniel Godsmark	Bonnie Doon	30	Brandon Ryan	Milawa	25
				Karl Norman	Glenrowan	22
2015	Ben Bond	Bright	30	Karl Norman	Glenrowan	23
2016	Kaine Herbert	Bonnie Doon	27	Karl Norman	Glenrowan	21
2017	Jeremy Wilson	Moyhu	26	Karl Norman	Glenrowan	25
2018	Chris Dube	Greta	26	Al Jacka	Ben All Blacks	22
2019	Jamie Allan &	Milawa	24	Al Jacka	Ben All Blacks	21
	Nick Lebish	Bright	24			
2020	O&K in recess >	COVID-19				
2021	Sean Cappitelli &	Bonnie Doon	21	Ben Clarke	Milawa	14
	Paul Harrison	Bright	21	Jackson Hourigan	Ben All Blacks	14
2022	Riley Moran	Benalla All Blacks	31	Jackson Hourigan	Ben All Blacks	22
2023	James McClounan	Greta		Jamie Dunn	Goorambat	
2024	Matthew Hedin	Bonnie Doon	22	Jack Kelly	Greta	21
2025	James McClounan	Greta	24	Paddy McNamara	Moyhu	23
2026	Cody Crawford &	Greta	25	Paddy McNamara	Moyhu	22
	Zak Satore	North Wangaratta	25			
2027						

- 1950: Jack Sullivan (Tarrawingee) runner up on count back. He has never been awarded a retrospective best & fairest medal like others have in the 1956 and 1978 Baker Medals.
- 1971: John Lappin (Chiltern) was ineligible to win the Baker Medal due to suspension during the season.
- 1994: Mark Porter, born 11/10/1976 was the youngest ever winner of the O&K Medal, aged 17 years, 10 months.
- 2000: In 2000, Greg Hogan and Tim Lowe were awarded the 1956 medal retrospectively, after finishing equal second on a countback.
- 2000: In 1978 Neville Pollard originally won the Baker Medal on a countback from John Lappin (Chiltern) and Terry Wadley (Greta). Lappin & Wadley were both awarded the medal, after a change in the O&K rules in 2000.
- 2000: In 2000, after former Moyhu player, Greg Hogan was retrospectively awarded the 1956 medal, after finishing equal second on a countback, he became part of the first father / son combination to win the medal. His son, Paul, won the medal in 1995 with Greta Football Club.

== Senior Leading Goal Kicking Winners ==
Seniors

	Ovens & King FNL: Senior Football Leading & Century Goalkickers				
Year	Winner	Club	Season Goals	Goals in finals	Total Goals
1903	Bob Condron	Rainbows			
1904					
1905					
1906	N Pinkerton	Wangaratta	7 plus		
1907	H Walker		16+		
1908					
1909	Laider	Wangaratta	10+		
1910	Cupplies	Wangaratta	16+		
1911	N Pinkerton	Wangaratta			
1912					
1913	H Hill	Moyhu	10+		
1914	H Hill	Moyhu	15+		
1915-18					In recess > WW1
1919	Ivo Atkinson	Wangaratta			
1920	Ivo Atkinson	Wangaratta	32+		
1921	Flegg	Wangaratta	21+		
1922	Andy Ferguson	Milawa			
1923	Andy Ferguson	Milawa			
1924	R McNamara	Gapsted	24+		
1925	J A "Andy" Ferguson	Milawa	31+		40
1926	Ossie Carter	Whorouly	26		
1927					
1928	Andy Ferguson	Milawa	81		
1929	Norm Wallace	Myrtleford	46+		
1930	Eric Johnstone	Moyhu	39+		
1931	Bert Carey	Wangaratta	85		
1932	Bert Carey	Wangaratta	76		
1933	Neville Justice	Myrtleford	58+		
1934	Syd Wortmann	Whorouly	79+		
1935	Ford Barton	Myrtleford	46+		
1936	Norm Wallace	Myrtleford	70+		
1937	Ford Barton	Myrtleford	37+		
1938	Len Jordon	Eldorado	53+		
1939	Sidney Londrigan	Beechworth	41		
1940	Jim Corker	Moyhu	30+		
1941	Ernie Ward	Rainbows	59		
1942-44					In recess > WW2
1945	Jock Gardner	Milawa	35+		
1946	Len Ablett	Myrtleford	108		
1947	Jim Corker	Moyhu	47+		
1948	A. “Wally” Cunneen	Myrtleford	64+		
1949	A. “Wally” Cunneen	Myrtleford	52+		
1950	?				
1951	Lex Nicoll	Whorouly	37+		
1952	Doug Ferguson	Eldorado	75		
1953					
1954	Gerry O’Neill	Chiltern	87		
1955	John Farmer	Tarrawingee	86+		
1956	Ron Howes	Chiltern	103		
1957	Ron Howes	Chiltern	71		
1958	McCoomb	Beechworth	59		
1959	Ivan Chant	Chiltern	54		
1960	Ted McSweeney	Whorouly	62		
1961	Ted McSweeney	Whrouly	71		
1962	Maurie Hogan	Greta	96		
1963	Maurie Hogan	Tarrwingee	78		
1964	John Farmer	Tarrawingee	68		
1965	Brian McDonald	Beechworth	63		
1966	Bob Stone	Tarrawingee	73		
1967	Bob Stone	Tarrawingee	57		
1968	Bill Cassidy	Chiltern	76		
1969	Bob McWaters	Beechworth	112		
1970	Ray Hooper	King Valley	102		
1971	Ray Hooper	King Valley	109		
1972	Bob McWaters	Beechworth	111		
1973	Graham Hill	Beechworth	92		
1974	Graham Hill	Beechworth	115		
1975	Graham Hill	Beechworth	110		
1976	Dave Piggott	Whorouly	89		
1977	Alan Sewell	Whorouly	126		
1978	Alan Sewell	Whorouly	104		
1979	Ron "Jock" Lappin	Chiltern	88		
1980	Glenn Daws	King Valley	61		
1981	Glen Daws	King Valley	68+		
1982	Steve Thompson	Bright	123		
1983	Jim McNamara	Whorouly	88		
1984	John Michelini	Milawa	114		
1985	Graham Hill	Beechworth	110		
1986	Mal Dinsdale &	Tarrawingee	74		
	Vere Mounsey	Bright	74		
1987	Mick Worthington	Whorouly	106		
1988	John Iwanuch	Moyhu	113		
1989	Tim Wallace	Beechworth	85+		
1990	Chris Long	Tarrawingee	106		
1991	Mark Higgs	Milawa	76		
1992	Mark O'Connor	Milawa	71		
1993	Peter Smith	Bright	81		
1994	Damian Lord	Bright	107		
1995	Alan Millard	Chiltern	84		
1996	Ray Robbins	Rutherglen	81		
1997	Peter Busch	Rutherglen	101		
1998	Darren Bate	Beechworth	100		
1999	Dale Andrews	Chiltern	93		
2000	Darren Bate	Beechworth	79		
2000	Darren Bate	Beechworth	79		
2001	Darren Bate	Beechworth	117		
2002	Darren Bate	Beechworth	97		
2003	Shane Moore	Moyhu	103		
2004	Shane Moore	Moyhu	108		
2005	Shane Moore	Moyhu	132		
	Brendan Session	Tarrawingee	111		
	Darren Bate	Whorouly	109		
2006	Shane Moore	Moyhu	103		
2007	Shane Moore	Moyhu	81		
2008	Brendan Sessions	Tarrawingee	135		
2009	Brendan Sessions	Tarrawingee	109	4	113
2010	Daniel West	Whorouly	96	4	100
2011	Duane Haebich &	Ben All Blacks	108		108
	Daniel Lewis	Milawa	108	9	117
	Brendan Sessions	King Valley	97	12	109
	Jeremy Wilson	Moyhu	85	16	101
2012	Richard Leahy	Whorouly	136	11	147
	Richard Findlay	North Wang	106	14	120
2013	Brendan Sessions	King Valley	100	5	105
2014	Hamish Moore	Tarrawingee	120	16	136
2015	Josh Evans	Bonnie Doon	85	7	92
2016	Kyle Raven	Tarrawingee	101	6	107
2017	Justin Hoggan	Tarrawingee	100	0	100
2018	James McClounan	Milawa	89	5	94
2019	Tom Mullane Grant	Bright	113	8	121
2020					In recess>COVID-19
2021	Daniel Cassidy	Greta	56	N/A	56
2022	Lachlin Thompson	Ben All Blacks	105	4	109
2023	Cooper Thomason	Bright	81	9	90
2024	Cooper Thomason	Bright	81	18	99
2025	1st: Michael Newton	Whorouly	129	22	151
	2nd: Cooper Thomason	Bright	108	8	116
	3rd: Brady Bartlett	Milawa	102	10	112
2026	Michael Newton	Whorouly	85	12	97
2027					
Year	Winner	Club	Season Goals	Goals in finals	Total Goals

- - +: Means that in some O&K matches, the individual goal tallies where not recorded and / or published in local newspapers.

== Football Seasons ==
=== 2004 ===
Ladder	W	L	D	For	Agst	%	Pts	Final	Team	G	B	Pts	Team	G	B	Pts
Moyhu	13	3	0	1738	1001	173.63	52	Elimination	Glenrowan	16	22	118	King Valley	12	13	85
Bright	13	3	0	1875	1118	167.71	52	Qualifying	Bright	20	11	131	Whorouly	18	9	117
Whorouly	11	5	0	1659	1009	164.42	44	1st Semi	Whorouly	11	9	75	Glenrowan	5	4	34
Glenrowan	10	6	0	1421	1129	125.86	40	2nd Semi	Bright	24	13	157	Moyhu	13	10	88
King Valley	8	8	0	1237	1539	80.38	32	Preliminary	Moyhu	13	11	89	Whorouly	12	8	80
Tarrawingee	6	10	0	1383	1594	86.76	24	Grand Final	Bright	13	10	88	Moyhu	12	12	84
Greta	6	10	0	1155	1341	86.13	24									
Milawa	4	12	0	951	1581	60.15	16									
North Wangaratta	1	15	0	876	1983	44.18	4									

=== 2005 ===
Ladder	W	L	D	For	Agst	%	Pts	Final	Team	G	B	Pts	Team	G	B	Pts
Moyhu	17	1	0	2805	1455	192.78	68	Elimination	Tarrawingee	20	23	143	Glenrowan	11	9	75
Whorouly	16	2	0	2583	1299	198.85	64	Qualifying	Whorouly	20	16	136	North Wangaratta	15	5	95
North Wangaratta	12	6	0	2370	1593	148.78	48	1st Semi	Tarrawingee	21	13	139	North Wangaratta	16	14	110
Glenrowan	11	7	0	2015	1334	151.05	44	2nd Semi	Moyhu	17	6	108	Whorouly	10	7	67
Tarrawingee	11	7	0	2170	1730	125.43	44	Preliminary	Whorouly	25	12	162	Tarrawingee	14	11	95
Milawa	7	11	0	1682	1656	101.57	28	Grand Final	Moyhu	15	8	98	Whorouly	12	16	88
King Valley	7	11	0	1843	1974	93.36	28									
Greta	5	13	0	1629	2314	70.40	20									
Bright	2	16	0	1195	3006	39.75	8									
Benalla All Blacks	2	16	0	1133	3064	36.98	8									

=== 2006 ===
Ladder	W	L	D	For	Agst	%	Pts	Final	Team	G	B	Pts	Team	G	B	Pts
Moyhu	16	2	0	2555	1334	191.53	64	Elimination	North Wangaratta	22	16	148	Tarrawingee	20	7	127
Greta	15	3	0	2222	1392	159.63	60	Qualifying	Whorouly	24	16	160	Greta	19	4	118
Whorouly	13	5	0	2306	1283	179.73	52	1st Semi	Greta	16	17	113	North Wangaratta	9	11	65
North Wangaratta	10	8	0	1889	1927	98.03	40	2nd Semi	Moyhu	21	11	137	Whorouly	12	18	90
Tarrawingee	8	10	0	1889	2066	91.43	32	Preliminary	Whorouly	16	9	105	Greta	13	17	95
Bright	8	10	0	1768	2064	85.66	32	Grand Final	Moyhu	19	13	127	Whorouly	10	15	75
Milawa	7	11	0	1467	1763	83.21	28									
King Valley	6	12	0	1736	1973	87.99	24									
Glenrowan	5	13	0	1138	2091	54.42	20									
Benalla All Blacks	2	16	0	1269	2346	54.09	8									

=== 2007 ===
Ladder	W	L	D	For	Agst	%	Pts	Final	Team	G	B	Pts	Team	G	B	Pts
Whorouly	16	2	0	2240	842	266.03	64	Elimination	Moyhu	12	14	86	King Valley	11	8	74
Bright	16	2	0	2341	939	249.31	64	Qualifying	Bright	20	15	135	Tarrawingee	10	10	70
Tarrawingee	14	4	0	2014	1088	185.11	56	1st Semi	Moyhu	9	10	64	Tarrawingee	6	10	46
Moyhu	12	6	0	1881	1211	155.33	48	2nd Semi	Bright	16	11	107	Whorouly	13	10	88
King Valley	11	7	0	1719	1304	131.83	44	Preliminary	Whorouly	12	13	85	Moyhu	9	9	63
Milawa	8	10	0	1373	1387	98.99	32	Grand Final	Whorouly	14	13	97	Bright	12	6	78
Glenrowan	6	12	0	1154	1738	66.40	24									
Greta	5	13	0	1136	1464	77.60	20									
North Wangaratta	2	16	0	861	2674	32.20	8									
Benalla All Blacks	0	18	0	535	2607	20.52	0									

=== 2008 ===
Ladder	W	L	D	For	Agst	%	Pts	Final	Team	G	B	Pts	Team	G	B	Pts
Tarrawingee	18	0	0	2744	902	304.21	72	Elimination	Moyhu	13	12	90	Milawa	11	13	79
Bright	14	4	0	2416	1169	206.67	56	Qualifying	Bright	15	25	115	Whorouly	10	8	68
Whorouly	14	4	0	2196	1352	162.43	56	1st Semi	Whorouly	10	21	81	Moyhu	1	3	9
Milawa	11	7	0	1814	1208	150.17	44	2nd Semi	Tarrawingee	12	20	92	Bright	5	13	43
Moyhu	10	8	0	1580	1778	88.86	40	Preliminary	Bright	18	11	119	Whorouly	14	17	101
Glenrowan	6	12	0	1302	1921	67.78	24	Grand Final	Tarrawingee	14	10	94	Bright	8	11	59
North Wangaratta	5	13	0	1241	1916	64.77	20									
King Valley	4	14	0	1152	2041	56.44	16									
Benalla All Blacks	4	14	0	1056	2175	48.55	16									
Greta	4	14	0	939	1978	47.47	16									

=== 2009 ===
Ladder	W	L	D	For	Agst	%	Pts	Final	Team	G	B	Pts	Team	G	B	Pts
Tarrawingee	18	0	0	2205	996	221.39	72	Elimination	Moyhu	14	12	96	Bright	13	8	86
Milawa	13	4	1	1936	1045	185.26	54	Qualifying	Milawa	17	12	114	Glenrowan	3	0	18
Glenrowan	11	5	2	1383	1183	116.91	48	1st Semi	Moyhu	12	11	83	Glenrowan	10	8	68
Moyhu	9	8	1	1464	1425	102.74	38	2nd Semi	Tarrawingee	8	7	55	Milawa	5	10	40
Bright	9	9	0	1418	1301	108.99	36	Preliminary	Milawa	14	15	99	Moyhu	12	6	78
Greta	9	9	0	1091	1265	86.25	36	Grand Final	Milawa	14	7	91	Tarrawingee	12	10	82
Whorouly	8	10	0	1387	1514	91.61	32									
Benalla All Blacks	7	11	0	1362	1692	80.50	28									
King Valley	4	14	0	1272	1783	71.34	16									
North Wangaratta	0	18	0	1053	2367	44.49	0									

=== 2010 ===
Ladder	W	L	D	For	Agst	%	Pts	Final	Team	G	B	Pts	Team	G	B	Pts
Bright	16	2	0	1997	947	210.88	64	1st Elimination	Whorouly	12	10	82	Greta	8	7	55
Milawa	15	2	1	2313	727	318.16	62	2nd Elimination	Bonnie Doon	9	16	70	Moyhu	9	8	62
Benalla All Blacks	15	3	0	2360	1304	180.98	60	1st Qualifying	Tarrawingee	9	17	71	Bright	5	4	34
Tarrawingee	14	3	1	2310	970	238.14	58	2nd Qualifying	Milawa	20	11	131	Benalla All Blacks	9	9	63
Whorouly	13	5	0	2004	1242	161.35	52	1st Semi	Bright	13	16	94	Whorouly	12	2	74
Moyhu	10	8	0	1849	1247	148.28	40	2nd Semi	Bonnie Doon	16	10	106	Benalla All Blacks	10	9	69
Bonnie Doon	9	9	0	1826	1523	119.89	36	1st Preliminary	Tarrawingee	16	15	111	Bonnie Doon	10	9	69
Greta	9	9	0	1290	1253	102.95	36	2nd Preliminary	Milawa	6	6	42	Bright	5	3	33
King Valley	8	10	0	1188	1846	64.36	32	Grand Final	Tarrawingee	15	9	99	Milawa	15	7	97
Glenrowan	7	11	0	1167	1545	75.53	28									
Tatong	3	15	0	1083	2197	49.29	12									
North Wangaratta	2	16	0	1129	2272	49.69	8									
Swanpool	2	16	0	797	2440	32.66	8									
Goorambat	2	16	0	624	2424	25.74	8									

=== 2011 ===
Ladder	W	L	D	For	Agst	%	Pts	Final	Team	G	B	Pts	Team	G	B	Pts
Moyhu	17	1	0	2295	1230	186.59	68	1st Elimination	Tarrawingee	26	8	164	North Wangaratta	5	8	38
Milawa	16	2	0	2806	830	338.07	64	2nd Elimination	King Valley	17	10	112	Greta	10	7	67
Benalla All Blacks	16	2	0	2527	1394	181.28	64	1st Qualifying	Moyhu	19	10	124	Whorouly	13	9	87
Whorouly	13	4	1	2066	1190	173.61	54	2nd Qualifying	Milawa	16	15	111	Benalla All Blacks	3	4	22
Tarrawingee	12	5	1	2203	1310	168.17	50	1st Semi	Tarrawingee	19	8	122	Whorouly	11	15	81
Greta	11	7	0	1760	1272	138.36	44	2nd Semi	Benalla All Blacks	21	15	141	King Valley	14	11	95
King Valley	11	7	0	1612	1307	123.34	44	1st Preliminary	Moyhu	13	19	97	Benalla All Blacks	10	10	70
North Wangaratta	8	10	0	1474	1742	84.62	32	2nd Preliminary	Tarrawingee	13	12	90	Milawa	9	22	76
Bonnie Doon	7	11	0	1548	1889	81.95	28	Grand Final	Moyhu	16	7	103	Tarrawingee	15	11	101
Bright	5	13	0	1357	1880	72.18	20									
Tatong	4	14	0	1520	2130	71.36	16									
Goorambat	3	15	0	968	2296	42.16	12									
Glenrowan	2	16	0	1023	1884	54.30	8									
Swanpool	0	18	0	538	3343	16.09	0									

=== 2012 ===
Ladder	W	L	D	For	Agst	%	Pts	Final	Team	G	B	Pts	Team	G	B	Pts
Milawa	16	2	0	2444	1120	218.21	64	1st Elimination	King Valley	14	9	93	Greta	8	13	61
Whorouly	15	3	0	2635	1116	236.11	60	2nd Elimination	Tarrawingee	11	15	81	Benalla All Blacks	11	5	71
North Wangaratta	15	3	0	2502	1075	232.74	60	1st Qualifying	Moyhu	12	12	84	Milawa	12	9	81
Moyhu	13	5	0	2082	1347	154.57	52	2nd Qualifying	North Wangaratta	16	10	106	Whorouly	10	4	64
King Valley	12	6	0	2041	1254	162.76	48	1st Semi	King Valley	16	10	106	Milawa	8	9	57
Tarrawingee	12	6	0	1740	1388	125.36	48	2nd Semi	Whorouly	14	11	95	Tarrawingee	10	12	72
Benalla All Blacks	11	7	0	2229	1295	172.12	44	1st Preliminary	Whorouly	14	11	95	Moyhu	12	18	90
Greta	8	10	0	1746	1535	113.75	32	2nd Preliminary	North Wangaratta	15	10	100	King Valley	10	10	70
Bright	7	11	0	1501	1841	81.53	28	Grand Final	North Wangaratta	20	10	130	Whorouly	12	11	83
Bonnie Doon	6	12	0	1613	1705	94.60	24									
Goorambat	4	14	0	1293	2174	59.48	16									
Swanpool	4	14	0	1180	2755	42.83	16									
Tatong	3	15	0	1161	2408	48.21	12									
Glenrowan	0	18	0	507	3661	13.85	0									

=== 2013 ===
Ladder	W	L	D	For	Agst	%	Pts	Final	Team	G	B	Pts	Team	G	B	Pts
Milawa	16	2	0	3148	894	352.13	64	1st Elimination	Whorouly	12	11	83	Bright	11	7	73
King Valley	15	3	0	2372	927	255.88	60	2nd Elimination	Moyhu	12	9	81	North Wangaratta	7	19	61
Tarrawingee	15	3	0	2157	930	231.94	60	1st Qualifying	Milawa	7	6	48	Glenrowan	6	4	40
Glenrowan	14	3	1	1892	1054	179.51	58	2nd Qualifying	Tarrawingee	10	16	76	King Valley	11	6	72
Bright	13	5	0	1847	1136	162.59	52	1st Semi	Glenrowan	16	11	107	Whorouly	9	8	62
Moyhu	12	6	0	2240	1318	169.95	48	2nd Semi	Moyhu	22	13	145	King Valley	13	8	86
North Wangaratta	11	6	1	2009	1138	176.54	46	1st Preliminary	Milawa	14	18	102	Moyhu	10	11	71
Whorouly	10	8	0	1917	1132	169.35	40	2nd Preliminary	Glenrowan	12	11	83	Tarrawingee	3	7	25
Bonnie Doon	5	13	0	1384	2036	67.98	20	Grand Final	Milawa	15	16	106	Glenrowan	7	3	45
Greta	4	14	0	1220	2096	58.21	16									
Goorambat	3	15	0	943	2376	39.69	12									
Swanpool	3	15	0	652	3449	18.90	12									
Tatong	2	16	0	871	2408	36.17	8									
Benalla All Blacks	2	16	0	855	2613	32.72	8									

=== 2014 ===
Ladder	W	L	D	For	Agst	%	Pts	Final	Team	G	B	Pts	Team	G	B	Pts
Glenrowan	17	1	0	2493	743	335.53	68	1st Elimination	Tarrawingee	13	14	92	Whorouly	6	7	43
Milawa	16	2	0	2493	774	322.09	64	2nd Elimination	Bright	21	13	139	Bonnie Doon	15	5	95
Tarrawingee	15	3	0	2134	902	236.59	60	1st Semi	Tarrawingee	14	9	93	Bright	6	10	46
Bonnie Doon	11	7	0	1647	1222	134.78	44	2nd Semi	Glenrowan	16	11	107	Milawa	11	11	77
Bright	11	7	0	1495	1240	120.56	44	Preliminary	Milawa	14	16	100	Tarrawingee	9	12	66
Whorouly	11	7	0	1430	1331	107.44	44	Grand Final	Glenrowan	16	13	109	Milawa	10	8	68
Moyhu	8	10	0	1479	1719	86.04	32									
Greta	7	11	0	1509	1581	95.45	28									
King Valley	6	12	0	1399	1720	81.34	24									
Benalla All Blacks	2	16	0	899	2387	37.66	8									
Goorambat	2	16	0	761	2135	35.64	8									
North Wangaratta	2	16	0	709	2694	26.32	8									

=== 2015 ===
Ladder	W	L	D	For	Agst	%	Pts	Final	Team	G	B	Pts	Team	G	B	Pts
Glenrowan	17	1	0	2409	649	371.19	68	1st Elimination	Bonnie Doon	16	6	102	King Valley	11	14	80
Milawa	16	2	0	2188	1039	210.59	64	2nd Elimination	Bright	17	5	107	Tarrawingee	5	8	38
Bonnie Doon	14	4	0	2018	1202	167.89	56	1st Semi	Bright	17	9	111	Bonnie Doon	11	18	84
Bright	13	5	0	1991	810	245.80	52	2nd Semi	Glenrowan	17	14	116	Milawa	13	10	88
Tarrawingee	12	6	0	1542	987	156.23	44	Preliminary	Milawa	16	14	110	Bright	16	4	100
King Valley	10	8	0	1665	1474	112.96	40	Grand Final	Glenrowan	9	13	67	Milawa	8	6	54
Whorouly	9	9	0	1414	1419	99.65	36									
Moyhu	7	11	0	1522	1685	90.33	28									
Greta	5	13	0	1264	1747	72.35	20									
North Wangaratta	3	15	0	895	2460	36.38	12									
Goorambat	2	16	0	892	2337	38.17	8									
Benalla All Blacks	0	18	0	711	2702	26.31	0									

=== 2016 ===
Ladder	W	L	D	For	Agst	%	Pts	Final	Team	G	B	Pts	Team	G	B	Pts
Bonnie Doon	17	1	0	1951	1001	194.91	68	1st Elimination	Tarrawingee	10	2	62	King Valley	7	9	51
Glenrowan	15	3	0	2018	758	266.23	60	2nd Elimination	Milawa	15	10	100	Goorambat	11	9	75
Tarrawingee	15	3	0	1788	802	222.94	60	1st Semi	Tarrawingee	12	9	81	Milawa	10	6	66
Goorambat	12	6	0	1422	1064	133.65	48	2nd Semi	Glenrowan	17	10	112	Bonnie Doon	7	10	52
Milawa	11	7	0	1816	1042	174.28	44	Preliminary	Tarrawingee	6	8	44	Bonnie Doon	6	5	41
King Valley	11	7	0	1619	1313	123.31	44	Grand Final	Glenrowan	16	11	107	Tarrawingee	6	7	43
Moyhu	9	9	0	1567	1392	112.57	36									
Bright	7	11	0	1474	1439	102.43	28									
Whorouly	5	13	0	1493	1534	97.33	20									
Benalla All Blacks	5	13	0	1337	1374	97.31	20									
Greta	1	17	0	727	2768	26.26	4									
North Wangaratta	0	18	0	453	3178	14.25	0									

=== 2017 ===
Ladder	W	L	D	For	Agst	%	Pts	Final	Team	G	B	Pts	Team	G	B	Pts
Tarrawingee	17	1	0	2474	768	322.14	68	1st Elimination	Glenrowan	23	10	148	Moyhu	13	7	85
Benalla All Blacks	16	2	0	1888	878	215.03	64	2nd Elimination	Goorambat	11	12	78	Milawa	6	8	44
Glenrowan	15	3	0	2110	1148	183.80	60	1st Semi	Glenrowan	24	18	162	Goorambat	8	8	56
Milawa	12	6	0	1720	1175	146.38	48	2nd Semi	Benalla All Blacks	17	11	113	Tarrawingee	14	6	90
Goorambat	11	7	0	1333	1378	96.73	44	Preliminary	Glenrowan	13	15	93	Tarrawingee	12	8	80
Moyhu	10	8	0	1575	1557	101.16	40	Grand Final	Glenrowan	13	12	90	Benalla All Blacks	6	7	43
Greta	6	12	0	1501	1535	97.79	24									
Bonnie Doon	6	12	0	1288	1729	74.49	24									
Bright	6	12	0	1108	1588	69.77	24									
King Valley	5	13	0	1282	1740	73.68	20									
Whorouly	4	14	0	1005	1647	61.02	16									
North Wangaratta	0	18	0	699	2840	24.61	0									

=== 2018 ===
Ladder	W	L	D	For	Agst	%	Pts	Final	Team	G	B	Pts	Team	G	B	Pts
Milawa	16	2	0	2668	584	456.85	64	1st Elimination	Benalla All Blacks	14	13	97	Bright	11	6	72
Tarrawingee	16	2	0	2441	732	333.47	64	2nd Elimination	Glenrowan	15	12	102	King Valley	9	8	62
Benalla All Blacks	14	4	0	2561	726	352.75	56	1st Semi	Benalla All Blacks	13	6	84	Glenrowan	7	10	52
Glenrowan	14	4	0	1918	1117	171.71	56	2nd Semi	Tarrawingee	12	10	82	Milawa	10	7	67
King Valley	12	6	0	1968	1035	190.14	48	Preliminary	Milawa	14	16	100	Benalla All Blacks	4	5	29
Bright	10	8	0	1908	1128	169.15	40	Grand Final	Tarrawingee	9	7	61	Milawa	5	4	34
Greta	10	8	0	1625	1216	133.63	40									
Whorouly	6	12	0	1508	1341	112.45	24									
Moyhu	6	12	0	1323	2024	65.37	24									
Goorambat	3	15	0	822	2170	37.88	12									
North Wangaratta	1	17	0	463	3290	14.07	4									
Bonnie Doon	0	18	0	366	4208	8.70	0									

=== 2019 ===
Ladder	W	L	D	For	Agst	%	Pts	Final	Team	G	B	Pts	Team	G	B	Pts
Milawa	18	0	0	2756	535	515.14	72	1st Elimination	Tarrawingee	20	12	132	Whorouly	10	12	72
Bright	15	3	0	2035	833	244.30	60	2nd Elimination	King Valley	14	11	95	Greta	5	6	36
Tarrawingee	14	4	0	1504	1143	131.58	56	1st Semi	Tarrawingee	10	9	69	King Valley	7	9	51
King Valley	12	6	0	1567	1122	139.66	48	2nd Semi	Milawa	19	9	123	Bright	12	8	80
Greta	11	7	0	1438	1314	109.44	44	Preliminary	Bright	13	17	95	Tarrawingee	10	9	69
Whorouly	10	8	0	1498	1233	121.49	40	Grand Final	Milawa	14	20	104	Bright	6	7	43
Benalla All Blacks	8	10	0	1135	1315	86.31	32									
Glenrowan	8	10	0	993	1466	67.74	32									
Bonnie Doon	6	12	0	1069	1656	64.55	24									
Goorambat	3	15	0	921	1704	54.05	12									
Moyhu	3	15	0	965	2005	48.13	12									
North Wangaratta	0	18	0	611	2166	28.21	0									

=== 2022 ===
Ladder	W	L	D	For	Agst	%	Pts	Final	Team	G	B	Pts	Team	G	B	Pts
Benalla All Blacks	17	1	0	2469	747	330.52	68	1st Elimination	Bonnie Doon	10	2	62	Goorambat	7	9	51
Bright	13	5	0	1665	931	178.84	52	2nd Elimination	Greta	14	7	91	Milawa	11	10	76
Bonnie Doon	13	5	0	1656	1053	157.26	52	1st Semi	Bonnie Doon	10	10	70	Greta	3	5	23
Greta	11	6	1	1409	1132	124.47	46	2nd Semi	Benalla All Blacks	17	13	115	Bright	7	14	56
Milawa	11	6	1	1384	1172	118.09	46	Preliminary	Bonnie Doon	8	8	56	Bright	7	5	47
Goorambat	10	6	2	1223	1065	114.84	44	Grand Final	Benalla All Blacks	8	12	60	Bonnie Doon	5	5	35
Tarrawingee	6	10	2	1314	1770	74.24	28									
Whorouly	5	13	0	1173	1484	79.04	20									
North Wangaratta	4	14	0	981	1645	59.64	16									
King Valley	4	14	0	1006	1815	55.43	16									
Moyhu	2	16	0	833	2299	36.23	8									

=== 2023 ===
Ladder	W	L	D	For	Agst	%	Pts	Final	Team	G	B	Pts	Team	G	B	Pts
Bonnie Doon	17	1	0	2300	604	380.79	68	1st Elimination	Bright	12	19	91	Moyhu	10	4	64
Greta	17	1	0	2083	769	270.87	68	2nd Elimination	Milawa	13	15	93	North Wangaratta	4	2	26
Bright	15	3	0	1992	671	296.87	60	1st Semi	Bright	10	13	73	Milawa	8	10	58
Milawa	12	6	0	1929	751	256.86	48	2nd Semi	Bonnie Doon	10	11	71	Greta	10	6	66
North Wangaratta	10	8	0	1172	1287	91.06	40	Preliminary	Bright	12	7	79	Greta	8	19	67
Moyhu	8	9	1	1419	1310	108.32	34	Grand Final	Bonnie Doon	8	8	56	Bright	6	2	38
King Valley	6	12	0	1076	1486	72.41	24									
Whorouly	5	13	0	980	1583	61.91	20									
Goorambat	4	14	0	873	1872	46.63	16									
Tarrawingee	3	15	0	704	2886	24.39	12									
Benalla All Blacks	1	16	1	729	2038	35.77	6									

=== 2024 ===
Ladder	W	L	D	For	Agst	%	Pts	Final	Team	G	B	Pts	Team	G	B	Pts
Bonnie Doon	18	0	0	2121	627	338.28	72	1st Elimination	Bright	14	10	94	King Valley	8	6	54
Greta	17	1	0	2558	749	341.52	68	2nd Elimination	Goorambat	19	15	129	Milawa	9	11	65
Bright	15	3	0	2089	757	275.96	60	1st Semi	Bright	18	11	119	Goorambat	7	3	45
Milawa	11	7	0	1712	1099	155.78	44	2nd Semi	Greta	15	8	98	Bonnie Doon	9	7	61
Goorambat	10	8	0	1589	1156	137.46	40	Preliminary	Bright	12	4	76	Bonnie Doon	10	9	69
King Valley	8	10	0	1084	1594	68.01	32	Grand Final	Greta	16	12	108	Bright	6	4	40
North Wangaratta	7	11	0	1199	1381	86.82	28									
Moyhu	6	12	0	988	1644	60.10	24									
Whorouly	3	15	0	732	1841	39.76	12									
Tarrawingee	3	15	0	783	2451	31.95	8									
Benalla All Blacks	1	17	0	640	2196	29.14	4									

=== 2025 ===
Ladder	W	L	D	For	Agst	%	Pts	Final	Team	G	B	Pts	Team	G	B	Pts
Greta	16	2	0	2184	1042	209.60	64	1st Elimination	Milawa	11	12	78	Bonnie Doon	9	19	73
Bright	15	3	0	2161	877	246.41	60	2nd Elimination	Whorouly	17	17	119	Goorambat	7	9	51
Milawa	14	4	0	2194	1075	204.09	56	1st Semi	Whorouly	16	6	102	Milawa	10	9	69
Goorambat	11	7	0	1718	1452	118.32	44	2nd Semi	Bright	11	10	76	Greta	10	9	69
Whorouly	11	7	0	1610	1362	118.21	44	Preliminary	Greta	16	18	114	Whorouly	4	7	31
Bonnie Doon	10	8	0	1302	1262	103.17	40	Grand Final	Bright	11	7	73	Greta	8	9	57
North Wangaratta	7	11	0	1480	1439	102.85	28									
Moyhu	5	13	0	1207	1583	76.25	20									
Tarrawingee	5	13	0	943	1619	58.25	20									
King Valley	4	14	0	1091	1894	57.60	16									
Benalla All Blacks	1	17	0	715	3000	23.83	4									

=== 2026 ===
Ladder	W	L	D	For	Agst	%	Pts	Final	Team	G	B	Pts	Team	G	B	Pts
Whorouly	16	2	0	2125	940	226.06	64	Qualifying	Bright	7	14	56	Moyhu	4	8	31
Bright	15	3	0	1927	880	218.98	60	Elimination	North Wangaratta	20	13	133	Greta	9	6	60
Moyhu	14	4	0	1720	1215	141.56	56	1st Semi	North Wangaratta	16	13	109	Moyhu	14	11	95
North Wangaratta	13	5	0	1769	991	178.51	52	2nd Semi	Bright	15	17	107	Whorouly	12	8	80
Greta	11	7	0	1884	1223	154.05	44	Preliminary	Whorouly	13	13	91	North Wangaratta	5	11	41
Bonnie Doon	9	9	0	1401	1259	111.28	36	Grand Final	Whorouly	8	8	56	Bright	6	12	48
King Valley	7	11	0	1131	1711	66.10	28									
Milawa	5	13	0	1070	1410	75.89	20									
Goorambat	5	13	0	972	1893	51.35	20									
Tarrawingee	4	14	0	929	1759	52.81	16									
Benalla All Blacks	0	18	0	900	2547	35.34	0									
