= Granya =

- Town
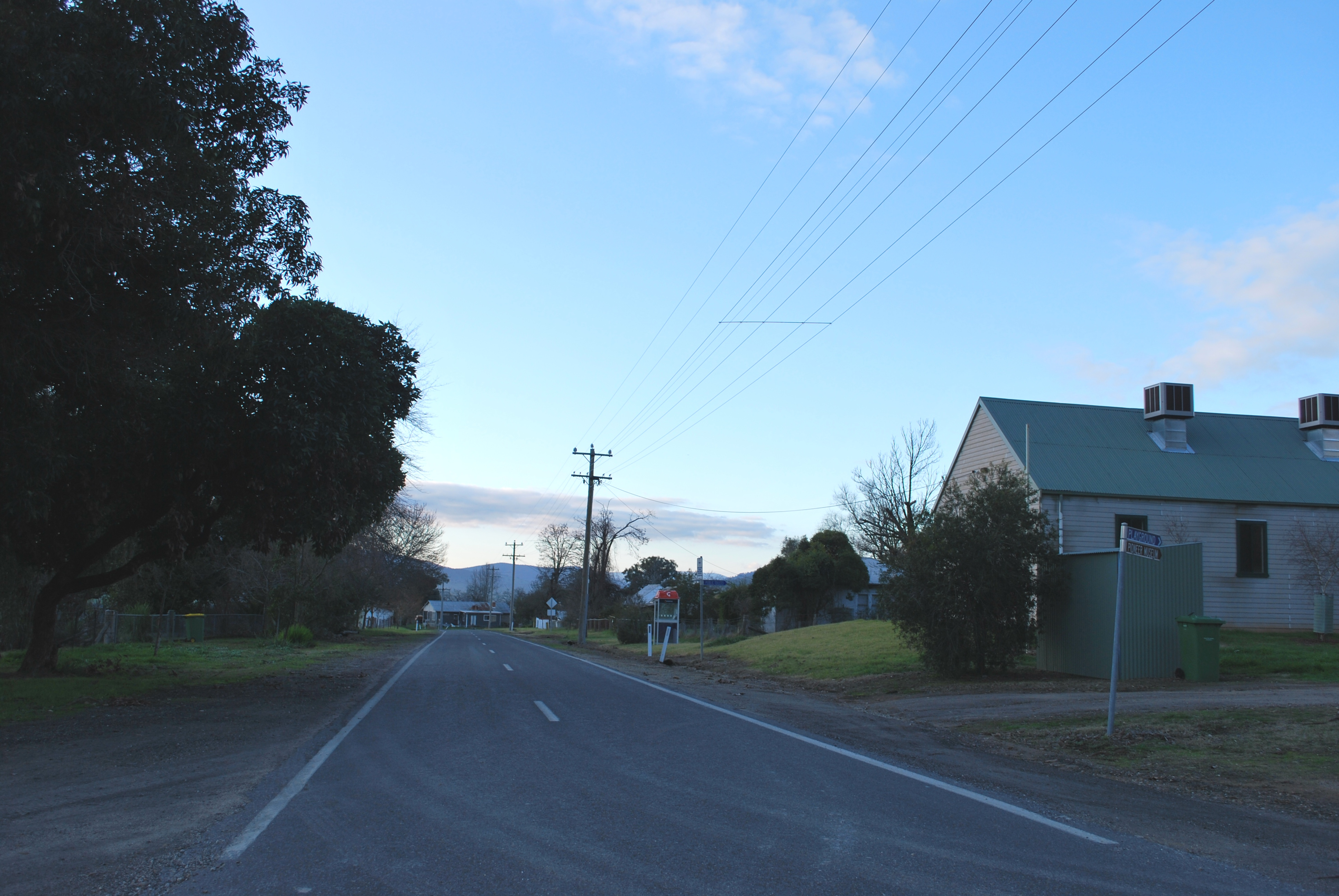
- Main street of Granya

- Coordinates: 36°06′30″S 147°19′07″E
- Country: Australia
- State: Victoria
- Region: Hume
- LGA: Shire of Towong
- Location: 378 km (235 mi) NW of Melbourne; 52 km (32 mi) E of Albury (NSW); 31 km (19 mi) NE of Tallangatta

Government
  - Federal division: Division of Indi

Population
  - Total: 99 (2016 census)

Granya is a town in northeastern Victoria, Australia on the Murray arm of Lake Hume in the Towong Shire local government area, 378 kilometres (235 mi) northwest of the state capital, Melbourne.

== History ==
The town was established in the 1860s following a gold rush.

In 1920 a huge monument was erected in honour of local fallen soldiers who died in the Great European War between 1915 and 1919.

Granya is situated right on the edge of Lake Hume and provides a base for many tourists sightseeing, fishing and water skiing.

== Sport & Recreation ==
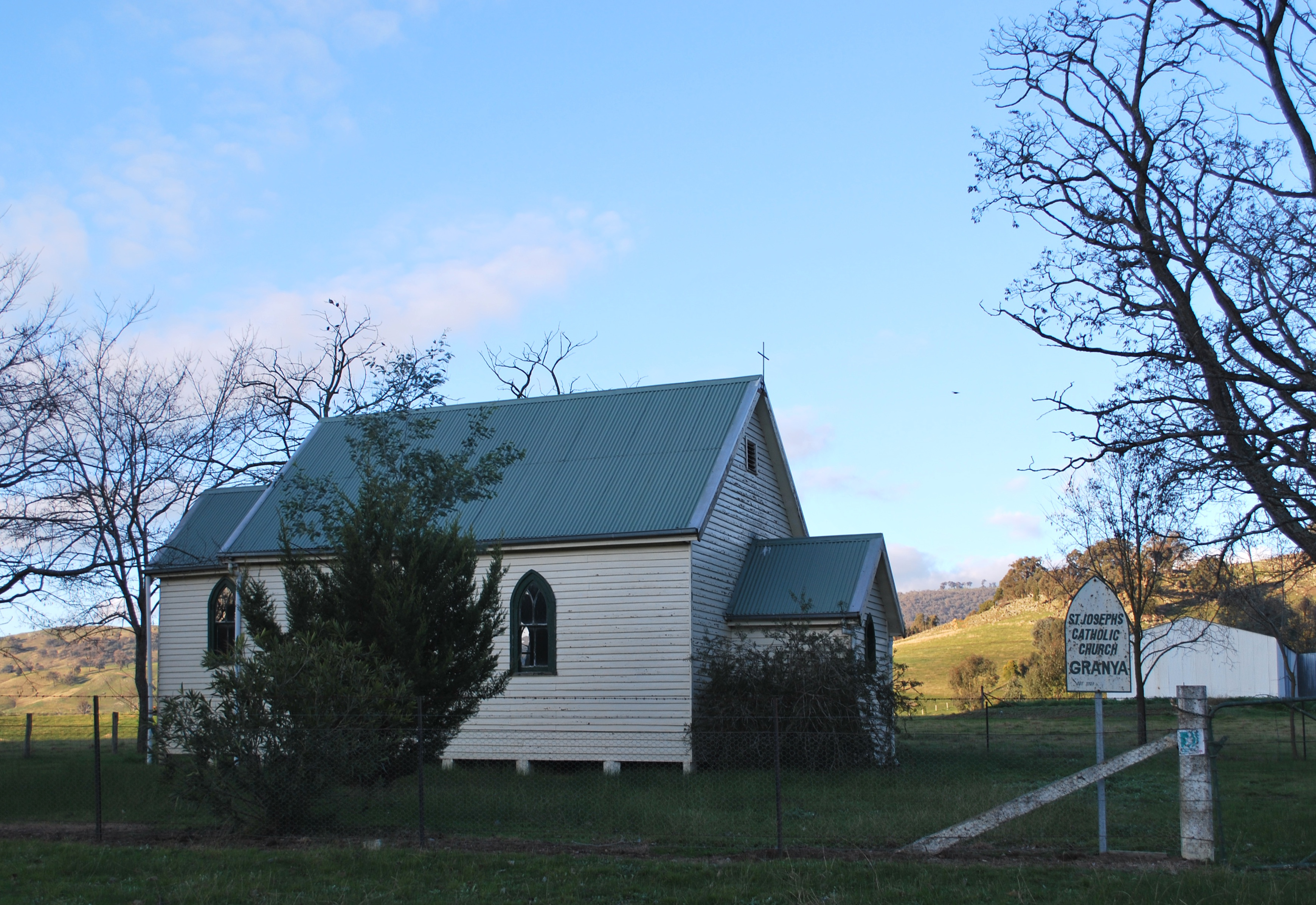
Granya's Roman Catholic Church

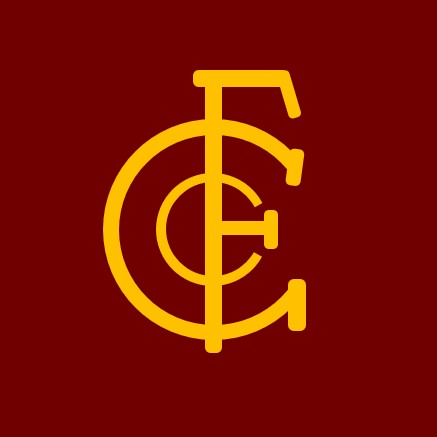
Granya Football Club colours

The Granya Football Club was formed in September 1886 at a meeting a Legges Hotel and a match against Tallangatta soon followed.

Former St Kilda Football Club player, Wally Scott played in Granya's 1912 premiership win and was later wounded in World War One at the Dardanelles.

In 1937, Granya applied to join both the Dederang & District Football League & Upper Murray Football Association, but were refused, so they went into recess in 1937 and 1938. Granya joined the Dederang & District Football League in 1939.

The backbone of the Granya Football teams in the 1930's and 1940's were the eight Webb brothers, six Star brothers and four Gard brothers who were all good footballers.

Former Granya footballers, Norm Webb, Don Star and Bill Barton all played senior VFL football.

Football timeline

- 1886 - 1903: Club active, but no competition football
- 1904 - 1905: Mitta Valley Football Association
- 1906 - Club active, but no competition football
- 1907 - 1908: Tallangatta Football Association
- 1909 - Club active, but no competition football
- 1910 - Mitta Valley Football Association
- 1911 -
- 1912 - Mitta Valley Football Association
- 1913 - Granya, Wymah & Bethanga Football Association
- 1914 - Applied to enter the Wodonga Football Association, but were rejected.
- 1915 - 1918: Club in recess. World War One
- 1919 - Mitta Valley Football Association (Khone Trophy)
- 1920 -
- 1921 - 1923: Tallangatta & District Football Association
- 1924 - 1928: Kiewa & District Football Association
- 1929 - 1931: Tallangatta & District Football Association
- 1932 - Yackandandah & District Football League
- 1933 - 1934: Tallangatta & District Football League
- 1935 -
- 1936 - Chiltern & District Football Association
- 1937 - 1938: Club in rescess
- 1939 - Dederang & District Football Association
- 1940 - Kiewa & Mitta Valleys Football Association
- 1941 - 1944: Club in recess. World War Two
- 1945 - 1954: Tallangatta & District Football League
- 1958 - 1959: Merged with Bethanga FC to form Murray United FC
- 1960 - Club folds.

Premierships / Runners Up

- Tallangatta Football Association
  - 1907 - Granya: 7.8 - 50 defeated Sandy Creek: 3.10 - 28
  - 1908 - Sandy Creek: 1.5 - 11 defeated Granya: 1.3 - 9
- Tallangatta & Mitta Mitta Football Association (Orr & Patterson Trophy)
  - 1912 - Granya: 6.12 - 48 defeated Mitta Mitta: 2.4 - 16
- Tallangatta & Mitta Mitta Football Association (Blair Trophy)
  - 1912 - Granya: 2.7 - 21 defeated Mitta Mitta: 1.7 - 13
- Tallangatta & District Football Association
  - 1922 - Tallangatta: 6.7 - 43 defeated Granya: 4.8 - 32
  - 1923 - Kiewa: 2.16 - 28 defeated Granya: 3.9 - 27
- Kiewa & District Football Association
  - 1926 - Granya: 4.18 - 42 defeated Bethanga: 5.8 - 38
  - 1927 - Granya: 8.11 - 59 defeated Bethanga: 3.1 - 19
  - 1928 - Mitta Valley: 12.8 - 80 d Granya: 4.11 - 35
- Tallangatta & District Football Association
  - 1929 - Granya: 9.14 - 68 defeated Albury Rovers: 8.12 - 60
  - 1930 - Mitta Mita: 5.11 - 41 defeated Granya: 4.14 - 38
  - 1933 - Granya: 14.13 - 97 defeated Mitta Mitta: 76
- Chiltern & District Football Association (Zone A)
  - 1936 - Kiewa: 9.18 - 72 defeated Granya: 6.7 - 49
- Tallangatta & District Football League
  - 1946 - Granya: 12.8 - 80 defeated Mitta / Eskkdale: 8.7 - 55
  - 1947 - Granya: 8.8 - 56 defeated Tallangatta: 7.10 - 52
  - 1950 - Bullioh Valley: 9.9 - 63 d Granya: 9.8 - 62
  - 1951 - Granya: 12.20 - 92 defeated Tallangatta: 9.16 - 72
  - 1953 - Mitta United: 6.9 - 45 defeated Granya: 3.7 - 25
- Tallangatta Knock Out Competition
  - 1951 - Granya / Tallangatta: 8.12 - 60 defeated Beechworth: 6.6 - 42

== Links ==
- Tallangatta & District Football League
- Yackandandah & District Football League
- 1946 - Tallangatta & DFL Premiers: Granya FC team photo
- Jim Star video about playing with Granya FC
