= 1954 Footscray Football Club season =

Footscray
1954 season
- President: Otto Grobbecker
- Coach: Charlie Sutton
- Captain(s): Charlie Sutton
- Home ground: Western Oval
- VFL season: 2nd
- Finals series: Premiers
- Best and Fairest: Ted Whitten
- Leading goalkicker: Jack Collins (84)

The 1954 Footscray season was the club's 29th since they began competing in the Victorian Football League (VFL) in 1925. After falling short in the Preliminary final the previous season, the Bulldogs finally won through to their first Grand Final, and beat Melbourne to claim their first VFL premiership, making them the first of the teams admitted to the VFL in 1925 to do so.

== Home-and-Away Season Summary and Results ==
The Bulldogs went into the 1954 VFL season as premiership contenders. However, the season did not start well with losses St Kilda and Richmond, both of which finished in the bottom four the previous season. In the following two matches, against South Melbourne and Carlton, the club returned to form with Jack Collins booting eight and nine goals respectively to help propel the Bulldogs to victory. In Round 7 against Hawthorn at Glenferrie Oval, Footscray, led by Don Ross after Ted Whitten injured his shoulder, came from 23 points down at the last break to kick seven goals and win by nine points. With Richmond upsetting Collingwood at Victoria Park that same day, the Bulldogs went to the top of the ladder, where they would stay until Round 11, when they lost to Collingwood by ten points in a top-of-the-ladder clash at Victoria Park. Footscray slipped to fourth in Round 16 when, at Arden Street Oval against North Melbourne, they looked set for a win, being 13 points up with five minutes remaining, before the home side rallied to snatch a draw with a behind on the siren. With two rounds remaining and seven teams still in contention for a finals berth, the pressure was on the Bulldogs when they met second-placed Essendon at Windy Hill. In a performance that set them up for their premiership success, Footscray won the match with a decisive five-goal-to-none third quarter to run out 19-point winners. Whitten was judged best on ground and Collins kicked six goals, while Essendon were clearly missing full-forward John Coleman, who had gone down with a career-ending knee injury earlier in the season.

Round	1	2	3	4	5	6	7	8	9	10	11	12	13	14	15	16	17	18
Ground	H	A	H	A	H	H	A	H	A	H	A	A	H	A	H	A	A	H
Result	L	L	W	W	W	W	W	W	L	W	L	W	L	W	L	D	W	W
Position	9	11	7	5	3	2	1	1	1	1	2	2	2	2	3	4	2	2

Updated to match(es) played on 18 September 2021. Source: VFL Ladder
A = Away; H = Home; W = Win; D = Draw; L = Loss
Notes: Positions show the situation at the end of the corresponding Game Round (GR); not the position at the conclusion of matches or game days

1954 Home & Away Season
Round	Date	Venue	Team	Home	Away	Result (Margin)	Pos.
Round	Date	Venue	Team	Score		Result (Margin)	Pos.
1	Saturday 17 April	Western Oval	St Kilda	7.11 (53)	9.10 (64)	Lost (11 points)	9th
2	Saturday 24 April	Punt Road Oval	Richmond	12.19 (91)	9.19 (73)	Lost (18 points)	11th
3	Saturday 1 May	Western Oval	South Melbourne	17.14 (116)	3.11 (29)	Won (87 points)	7th
4	Saturday 8 May	Princes Park	Carlton	17.21 (123)	20.14 (134)	Won (11 points)	5th
5	Saturday 15 May	Western Oval	North Melbourne	11.7 (73)	5.5 (35)	Won (38 points)	3rd
6	Saturday 22 May	Western Oval	Essendon	12.8 (80)	4.7 (31)	Won (49 points)	2nd
7	Saturday 29 May	Glenferrie Oval	Hawthorn	10.9 (69)	11.12 (78)	Won (9 points)	1st
8	Saturday 5 June	Western Oval	Fitzroy	13.9 (87)	10.14 (74)	Won (13 points)	1st
9	Monday 14 June	Kardinia Park	Geelong	9.13 (67)	8.15 (63)	Lost (4 points)	1st
10	Saturday 26 June	Western Oval	Melbourne	10.13 (73)	8.9 (57)	Won (16 points)	1st
11	Saturday 3 July	Victoria Park	Collingwood	12.10 (82)	10.12 (72)	Lost (10 points)	2nd
12	Saturday 10 July	Junction Oval	St Kilda	9.8 (62)	13.14 (92)	Won (30 points)	2nd
13	Saturday 24 July	Western Oval	Richmond	6.9 (45)	6.13 (49)	Lost (4 points)	2nd
14	Saturday 31 July	Lake Oval	South Melbourne	6.5 (41)	11.12 (78)	Won (37 points)	2nd
15	Saturday 7 August	Western Oval	Carlton	6.7 (43)	8.12 (60)	Lost (17 points)	3rd
16	Saturday 14 August	Arden Street Oval	North Melbourne	9.14 (68)	9.14 (68)	Drawn	4th
17	Saturday 21 August	Windy Hill	Essendon	7.17 (59)	11.12 (78)	Won (19 points)	2nd
18	Saturday 28 August	Western Oval	Hawthorn	17.15 (117)	5.4 (34)	Won (83 points)	2nd

1954 VFL Finals Series
Round	Date	Venue	Team	Home	Away	Result (Margin)
Round	Date	Venue	Team	Score		Result (Margin)
SF2	Saturday 11 September	Melbourne Cricket Ground	Geelong	8.14 (62)	11.19 (85)	Won (23 points)
GF	Saturday 25 September	Melbourne Cricket Ground	Melbourne	15.12 (102)	7.9 (51)	Won (51 points)

== 1954 Finals Series ==
Captain-coach Charlie Sutton, who had been struggling since injuring his left knee against Carlton, was declared fit by the selectors to play against Geelong in the Semi Final after getting through a training session, but pulled out at the last minute on advice of the club doctor. Lionel Ryan, who had been dropped to accommodate Sutton, was reinstated to the team, and defender Wally Donald took charge of the team on the field.

The Melbourne Cricket Ground was undergoing renovation work to be ready for the 1956 Summer Olympics, and the demolition of the public stand left a gap for the breeze to affect the game. Geelong kicked with the wind in the first quarter, and in the early going it looked like the pace and class which had taken them to the last three Grand Finals would again do the job. The Bulldogs began to work their way into the match, led by their defence – the finest in the League – which managed to restrict Geelong to four goals whilst themselves kicking three against the wind, goals that would be crucial in deciding the outcome.

== Ladder ==
(P)	Premiers
	Qualified for finals

#	Team	P	W	L	D	PF	PA	%	Pts
1	Geelong	18	13	5	0	1630	1225	133.1	52
2	Footscray (P)	18	11	6	1	1423	1095	130.0	46
3	North Melbourne	18	11	6	1	1355	1361	99.6	46
4	Melbourne	18	11	7	0	1504	1239	121.4	44
5	Richmond	18	10	8	0	1503	1310	114.7	40
6	Essendon	18	10	8	0	1471	1364	107.8	40
7	Collingwood	18	10	8	0	1312	1301	100.8	40
8	Carlton	18	8	10	0	1382	1391	99.4	32
9	Hawthorn	18	8	10	0	1177	1337	88.0	32
10	South Melbourne	18	6	12	0	1209	1482	81.6	24
11	Fitzroy	18	4	13	1	1174	1604	73.2	18
12	St Kilda	18	4	13	1	1149	1580	72.7	18

Rules for classification: 1. premiership points; 2. percentage; 3. points for
Average score: 75.4
Source: AFL Tables

== See also ==
- 1954 VFL Grand Final
