= Dudley Probyn =

Australian rules footballer, born 1912

Personal information
- Full name: Dudley Charles Probyn
- Born: 1 October 1912; Mt Korong, Victoria
- Died: 13 December 2005 (aged 93)
- Original team: South Sydney
- Height: 182 cm (6 ft 0 in)
- Weight: 84 kg (185 lb)

Playing career^{1}
Years	Club	Games (Goals)
1938–1941	Prahran (VFA)	65 (79)
1942	St Kilda	9 (18)
1945–1946	Wodonga (O&M)	? (14)
- ^{1} Playing statistics correct to the end of 1942.

Dudley Charles "Doug" Probyn (1 October 1912 – 13 December 2005) was an Australian rules footballer who played with St Kilda in the Victorian Football League (VFL).

Probyn was recruited to St. Kilda via Prahan FC after playing in their 1940 VFA grand final loss to Port Melbourne.

Probyn coached the Wodonga Football Club in 1945 and 1946, winning the club's 1945 best and fairest award and also the Border Football Association best and fairest award, The Border Mail Medal in 1945.

In 1948, Probyn was captain-coach of the Wodonga Rovers FC in the Chiltern & District Football Association and finished 5th in the Huggins Medal with 11 votes, with the team finishing third after losing the preliminary final.

Probyn then won the 1949 - K J Azzi Medal in the Hume Football League when playing the Brocklesby Football Club. Probyn was their premiership captain-coach in 1950 and played with Brocklesby up until 1951.

Probyn also won the Benalla & District Football League's best and fairest award as captain of the Tolmie Football Club in 1952.

Probyn played with Milawa in the Ovens & King Football League in 1953, kicking 17 goals for the season.
