= Chiltern & District Football Association =

The Chiltern & District Football Association was first established in 1912 from six Australian Rules Football clubs—Barnawartha, Chiltern, Chiltern Valley, Christmastown, Southern and Wodonga—in North Eastern Victoria, Australia, and was an active competition until 1956 when it was wound up.

== History ==
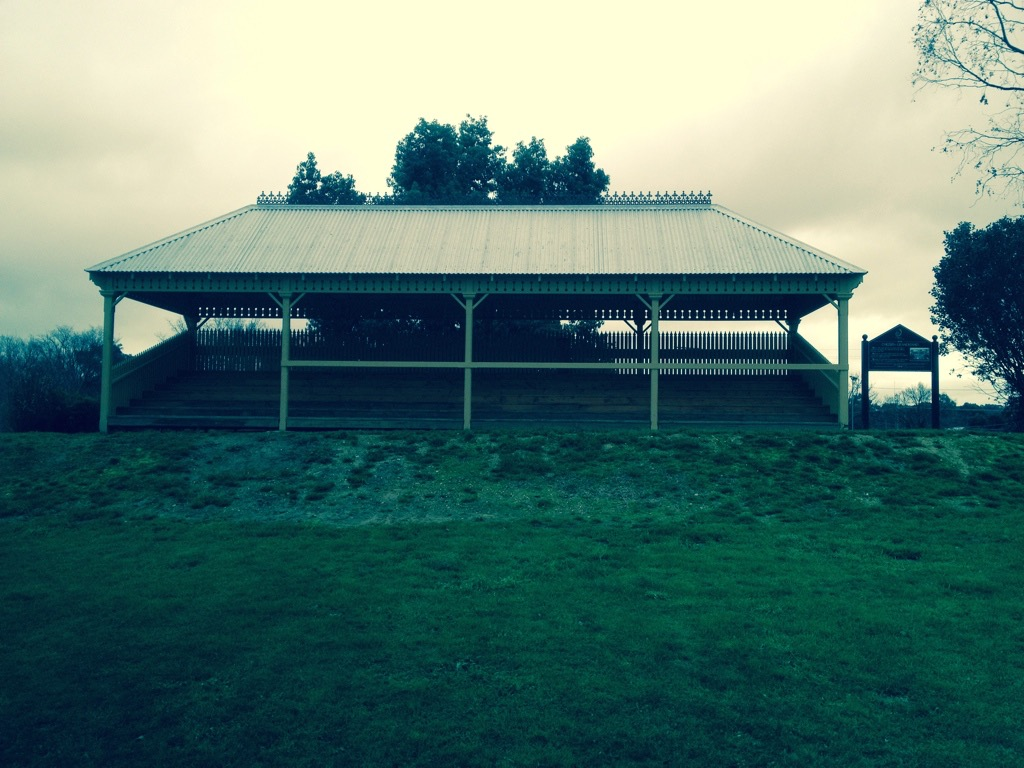

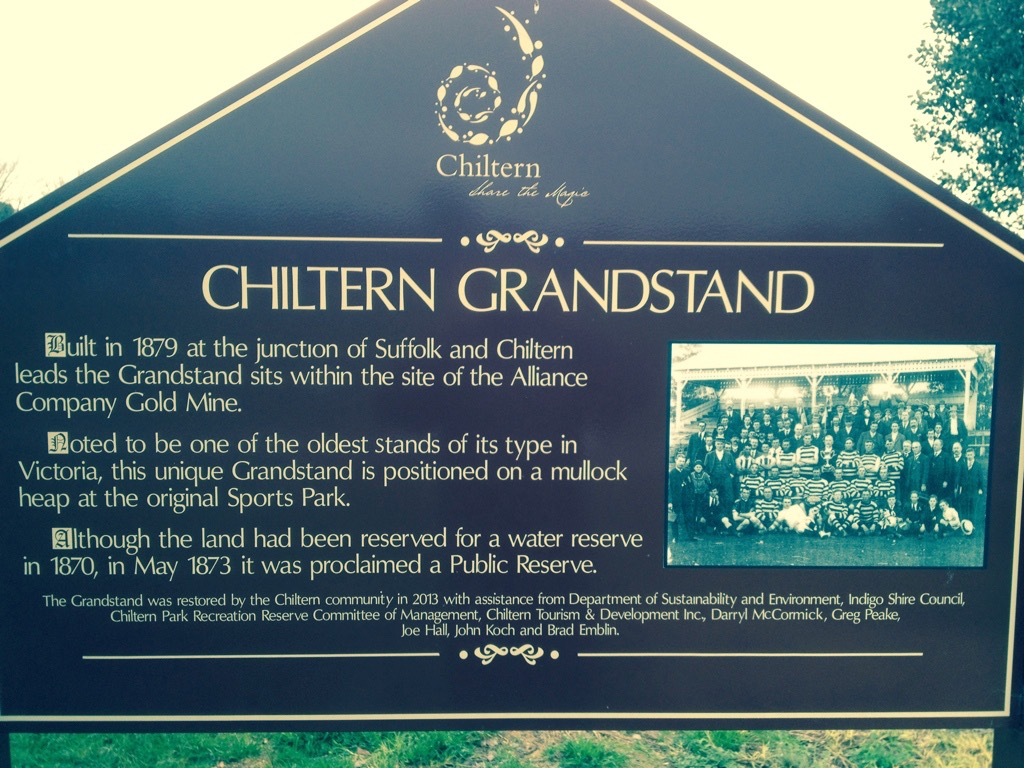
Chiltern Park - Grandstand Plaque information, Chiltern, Victoria, Australia

The Chiltern & District Football Association was first established in 1912 from six Australian Rules Football clubs—Barnawartha, Chiltern, Chiltern Valley, Christmastown, Southern and Wodonga.

The Southern Football Club was made up of employees from the Great Southern Mine from South Rutherglen.

1500 spectators attended the inaugural grand final match at the Chiltern Park Oval to watch Chiltern Valley defeat Wodonga in 1912.

In 1913, there was much speculation about which club won the minor premiership, with Wodonga FC claiming they had the most goals and points for the season. Three matches were deemed void due to protests and clubs were ordered to replay these matches, just before the finals too. The Southern FC refused to play Wodonga in a semi-final due to an appeal not being decided on, while the other semi-final match was played with Brown's Plain defeating United Miners. Finally, the C&DFA Delegates decided to abandon the season.

The club jumper colours worn in 1919 were as follows - Chiltern: red and white, Chiltern Valley: yellow and blue, Rutherglen: green and gold, Springhurst: blue and white, Wahgunyah: black and white. Rutherglen's senior team played in the Ovens and Murray Football League in 1919.

In 1920, when the Ovens and Murray Football League went into recess, three of the four competing clubs, Howlong, Lake Rovers and Rutherglen joined the C&DFL and the fourth club, Corowa joined the Coreen & District Football League. In June 1920, there was a match between the C&DFA and the Albury Border Football Association.

Both semi-final matches In 1929 had to be replayed after appeals were lodged by both Chiltern and Rutherglen.

In 1932, A Costin - Howlong & H Scott - Wodonga, tied on 12 votes each for the Rudduck & Co Best and Fairest Award, with Costin eventually winning on a countback.

The 1933 C&DFA grand final saw Wodonga defeat Beechworth Wanderers. Wodonga's Clive Bohr was judged as the best and fairest player in the grand final.

In 1937, Barnawartha's, Leslie A. Winnett, won the Chiltern & DFA best and fairest Award, the Hooper Cup.

The C&DFA club jumper colours in 1939 were: Albury - blue and gold; Balldale, royal Blue and gold braces; Barnawartha - yellow and black; Chiltern - red and white; Corowa - black and red; Howlong - red and blue; Springhurst - red, white and blue.

Towards the end of World War II, the C&DFA was re-established in 1945 from five teams—Barnawartha, Beechworth, Chiltern, Howlong and Rutherglen—with Chiltern defeating Howlong by eight points in the grand final.

In August 1950, Gerry O’Neill kicked 24 goals against Springhurst in round 16, to bring his goal tally to 116 for the season. O'Neill finished the 1950 season with 139 goals, after kicking nine goals in the grand final win against Howlong.

On the 13th July 1953, Gerry O'Neill had kicked 103 goals for the season.

== Clubs ==
=== Final ===
Club	Jumper	Nickname	Home Ground	Former League	Est.	Years in comp	CDFA Senior Premierships		Fate
Club	Jumper	Nickname	Home Ground	Former League	Est.	Years in comp	Total	Years	Fate
Bandiana (Army)	Dark with light BFC monogram		Bandiana Recreation Reserve, Bandiana	T&DFL	1947	1947-1950, 1953-1956	0	-	Moved to Yackandandah & District FL in 1952 and Tallangatta & District FL in 1957
Barnawartha	(1939)(?-1956)	Tigers	Barnawartha Recreation Reserve, Barnawartha	R&DFA	1911	1912-1915, 1920-1940, 1945-1956	4	1921, 1923, 1925, 1956	Moved to Tallangatta & District FL in 1957
Bethanga		Bombers	Bethanga Recreation Reserve, Bethanga	T&DFL	1904	1956	0	-	Returned to Tallangatta & District FL in 1957
Lavington	(1946); Dark with light band (1947)(1956)	Saints	Urana Road Oval, Lavington	HFL	1924	1946-1956	0	-	Entered recess in 1957. Moved to Tallangatta & District FL in 1958
Springhurst			Springhurst Recreation Reserve, Springhurst	O&MFA	1893	1919-1920, 1922-1924, 1926-1927, 1930, 1933-1937, 1939, 1950-1956	1	1920	Played in Ovens & Murray FA in 1923. Recess in 1928-29, 1931-32, 1938 and 1940-49. Folded in 1957
St Patrick's		Saints	Xavier High School Oval, North Albury	A&DFL	1919	1954-1956	0	-	Folded in 1957
Wahgunyah	(1931-37)(1950-56)	Blue and Whites	Wahgunyah Recreation Reserve, Wahgunyah	CDFA, C&DFA	1908	1931-1937, 1950-1956	4	1919, 1924, 1954, 1955	Returned to Coreen & District FL in 1948 and 1957
Yackandandah			Butson Park, Yackandandah	Y&DFL	1884	1933-1935, 1954-1956	0	-	Moved to Dederang & District FA in 1936. Moved to Tallangatta & District FL in 1957

=== Former ===
Club	Jumper	Nickname	Home Ground	Former League	Est.	Years in comp	CDFA Senior Premierships		Fate
Club	Jumper	Nickname	Home Ground	Former League	Est.	Years in comp	Total	Years	Fate
Albury Rovers				ABFA, A&DFL	1926	1928, 1939-1940	1	1928	Moved to Tallangatta & District FA following 1928 season. Moved to Albury & District FL following WWII
Balldale			Balldale Cricket Ground, Balldale	CDFA, HFL	1906	1935-1940, 1946	0	-	Moved to Hume FL in 1947
Beechworth Reserves		Bombers	Baarmutha Park, Beechworth	MDFL, Y&DFL	1861	1945, 1954	0	-	Moved to Ovens & King FL in 1955
Beechworth Wanderers		Wanderers	Baarmutha Park, Beechworth	–	1930	1930-1935	1	1932	Merged with Beechworth to form Beechworth United in 1936
Browns Plains				–	1913	1913-1914	0	-	Folded
Chiltern		Swans	Chiltern Recreation and Sports Reserve, Chiltern	R&DFA	1860s	1912-1915, 1919-1940, 1945-1953	13	1914, 1922, 1924, 1929, 1936, 1940, 1945, 1947, 1948, 1949, 1950, 1951, 1953	Moved to Ovens & King FL in 1954
Chiltern Valley			Chiltern Valley Recreation Reserve, Chiltern Valley	–	1912	1912-1913, 1915, 1919-1920	1	1912	Folded after 1920 season
Christmastown			Christmastown Recreation Reserve, Cornishtown	–	1912	1912, 1915-1916	1	1916	Folded after 1916 season
Corowa Rovers		Rovers	John Foord Oval, Corowa	–	1938	1938-1939	0	-	Folded in 1940 due to WWII
Corowa Stars (1)		Stars	John Foord Oval, Corowa	–	1926	1926-1929	1	1927	Moved to Corowa & District FA in 1930
Corowa Stars (2)		Stars	John Foord Oval, Corowa	–	1949	1949-1952	1	1952	Moved to Ovens & Murray FL in 1953 as Corowa's reserves side
Gooramadda				–		1920, 1922	0	-	Folded
Granya			Bungil Park, Granya	T&DFL	1886	1936	0	-	Entered recess in 1937. Re-formed in Dederang & District FA in 1939
Great Southern			Southern Ground, Rutherglen	O&MFL	1898	1912-1913	0	-	Folded in 1914
Howlong	(?-1930s)(1930s-52)	Spiders	Howlong Oval, Howlong	O&MFL, CDFA	1898	1915-1916, 1923-1929, 1931-1952	4	1915, 1937, 1938, 1939	Moved to Ovens & Murray FL in 1919, Corowa & District FA in 1930 and Hume FL in 1953
Howlong Juniors			Howlong Oval, Howlong	–		1920-1922	0	-	Folded
Howlong United			Howlong Oval, Howlong	–		1920-1923	0	-	Folded
Kiewa Valley			Kiewa Memorial Park, Kiewa	T&DFL	1895	1934-1936	1	1934	Moved to Dederang & District FA in 1937
Lake Rovers		Rovers	Barkly Park, Rutherglen	O&MFL	1911	1920	0	-	Returned to Ovens & Murray FL in 1921
Mitta Mitta			Magorra Park, Mitta Mitta	T&DFL	1880s	1936	0	-	Entered recess in 1937. Re-formed in Kiewa & Mitta FA in 1940
Mount Ophir			The Freehold, Rutherglen	–	1914	1914	0	-	Folded in 1915
North Albury		Hoppers	Bunton Park, North Albury	–	1943	1946	1	1946	Moved to Ovens & Murray FL in 1947
Rutherglen		Redlegs	Barkly Park, Rutherglen	O&MFL	1893	1920, 1945	0	-	Returned to Ovens & Murray FL in 1921 and 1946
Rutherglen Rovers			Barkly Park, Rutherglen	–	1924	1924-1933	2	1930, 1931	Folded
St Patrick's Reserves		Saints	Xavier High School Oval, North Albury	–	1919	1923-1924	0	-	Reserves team of Ovens & Murray FA club
South Albury			Waites Park, South Albury	ABFA	1940s	1949-1952	0	-	Folded in 1952. Re-formed in Tallangatta & District FL in 1977
Tallangatta		Magpies	Rowen Park, Tallangatta	T&DFL	1885	1935-1936	0	-	Entered recess in 1937. Re-formed in Dederang & District FA in 1939
United Miners		Gold Seekers	Prentice Freehold Mine, Rutherglen	O&MFL	1894	1913-1915	1	1913	Folded
Wangaratta Rovers Reserves		Hawks	WJ Findlay Oval, Wangaratta	–	1922	1952	0	-	Moved to Ovens & Murray FL in 1953
Wodonga		Maroons	Martin Park, Wodonga	TSFA, ABFA, T&DFL	1878	1912-1913, 1915, 1930-1935	2	1933, 1935	Moved to Wodonga & District FA in 1914 and to Ovens & Murray FL in 1936
Wodonga Reserves		Maroons	Martin Park, Wodonga	–	1878	1940	0	-	Moved to Ovens & Murray FL
Wodonga Rovers (1)			Martin Park, Wodonga	T&DFL		1924-1928, 1930	1	1926	Folded
Wodonga Rovers (2)			Martin Park, Wodonga	–	1947	1947-1952	0	-	Moved to Ovens & Murray FL in 1953 as Wodonga's reserves side

== C&DFA - Honourboard ==
Year	Actual Teams	Premiers	Score	Runners up	Score	Grand Final Venue / Notes
1912	6	Chiltern Valley	5.8 - 38	Wodonga	4.2 - 26	At Chiltern Park
1913	9					No finals due to protests
1914	7	Chiltern	5.11 - 41	Mt. Ophir	5.6 - 36	Chiltern Park
1915	7	Howlong	2.9 - 19	Wodonga	0.5 - 5	Chiltern Park
1916	4	Christmastown	7.13 - 55	Chiltern Valley	7.4 - 46	Chiltern Park
1917&18						In recess, World War 1
1919	5	Wahgunyah	4.11 - 35	Chiltern Valley	2.8 - 20	Chiltern Park
1920	10	Springhurst *	5.13 - 43	Lake Rovers	4.8 - 32	* Undefeated. 2 Divisions
1921		Barnawartha	5.5 - 35	Howlong	3.6 - 24	
1922	6	Chiltern	4.8 - 32	Barnawartha	2.5 - 17	Barnawartha
1923	6	Barnawartha	3.11 - 29	Howlong	2.6 - 18	
1924	8	Chiltern	6.14 - 50	Wahgunyah	7.8 - 50	Drawn Grand Final at Corowa
		Wahgunyah	12.10 - 82	Chiltern	7.7 - 49	Grand Final Replay at Rutherglen
1925	6	Barnawartha	3.7 - 35	Howlong	2.5 - 17	Chiltern Park
1926	8	Wodonga Rovers	12.11 - 83	Wahgunyah	6.8 - 44	Rutherglen
1927	8	Corowa Stars	11.6 - 72	Wodonga Rovers	10.10 - 70	Chiltern Park
1928	8	Albury Rovers	13.22 - 100	Wodonga Rovers	8.9 - 57	Chiltern Park
1929	6	Chiltern	9.14 - 68	Rutherglen Rovers	5.10 - 40	Chiltern Park
1930	5	Rutherglen Rovers	9.11 - 65	Chiltern	8.12 - 60	?
1931	7	Rutherglen Rovers	8.13 - 61	Wodonga	7.14 - 56	Chiltern Park
1932	7	Beechworth Wanderers	8.14 - 62	Rutherglen Rovers	9.7 - 61	Chiltern Park
1933	9	Wodonga	16.9 - 105	Beechworth Wanderers	7.9 - 51	Barnawartha
1934	9	Kiewa Valley	10.12 - 72	Wodonga	8.12 - 60	Beechworth
1935	11	Wodonga	11.19 - 85	Kiewa	12.11 - 83	Barnawartha
1936	10	Chiltern	7.11 - 53	Kiewa	7.8 - 50	Barnawartha. 2 Divisions
1937	6	Howlong	16.13 - 109	Chiltern	13.10 - 88	Balldale.
1938	5	Howlong	13.17 - 95	Chiltern	12.1 - 73	Barnawartha
1939	7	Howlong	20.22 - 144	Corowa Rovers	9.11 - 65	Barnawartha
1940	5	Chiltern	15.12 - 102	Howlong	7.10 - 52	Barnawartha
1941-44						In recess, World War 2
1945	5	Chiltern	11.10 - 76	Howlong	9.14 - 68	Rutherglen
1946	6	North Albury	12.15 - 87	Chiltern	4.17 - 41	Howlong
1947	6	Chiltern	15.10 - 100	Howlong	14.13 - 97	Barnwartha
1948	6	Chiltern	16.12 - 108	Howlong	10.10 - 70	Wodonga
1949	8	Chiltern	7.3 - 45	South Albury	6.6 - 42	Albury
1950	10	Chiltern	14.12 - 96	Howlong	7.13 - 55	Barnawartha
1951	10	Chiltern	9.8 - 62	Howlong	4.13 - 37	Barnawartha
1952	10	Corowa Stars	17.17 - 119	Chiltern	16.8 - 104	Wodonga
1953	6	Chiltern	12.12 - 84	Barnawartha	8.12 - 60	Springhurst
1954	8	Wahgunyah	13.9 - 87	Barnawartha	12.15 - 87	Drawn Grand Final at Lavington
		Wahgunyah	8.12 - 60	Barnawartha	7.15 - 57	Grand Final Replay at Bandiana
1955		Wahgunyah	14.13 - 97	Lavington	6.10 - 46	Barnawartha
1956	8	Barnawartha	11.15 - 81	Lavington	10.7 - 67	Bandiana
Year	Actual Teams	Premiers	Score	Runners up	Score	Grand Final Venue / Notes

Most Chiltern & DFA - Premierships / Runners Up

Club	Most Premierships	Runners up	Draws	Grand Finals
Chiltern	12	6	1	18
Howlong	4	9		13
Barnawartha	4	3	1	8
Wahgunyah	4	1	2	7
Wodonga	2	4		6
Rutherglen Rovers	2	2		4
Corowa Stars	2			2
Chiltern Valley	1	2		3
Wodonga Rovers	1	2		3
Beechworth Wanderers	1	1		2
Albury Rovers	1			1
Christmastown	1			1
Kiewa Valley	1			1
North Albury	1			1
Springhurst	1			1
Kiewa		2		2
Lavington		2		2
Corowa Rovers		1		1
Lake Rovers		1		1
Mount Ophir		1		1
South Albury		1		1
TOTAL	38	38	4	80

== Chiltern & District Football Association - Best and Fairest Award ==
Year	Award name	Winner	Club	Votes	Runners up	Club	Votes
1932	Rudduck & Co	A Costin	Howlong	12	H Scott	Wodonga	12
1933							
1934							
1935							
1936							
1937	Hooper Cup	Leslie A. Winnett	Barnawartha				
1938							
1939	Azzi Medal	Clive Walters	Howlong	15	Frank "Gunboat" Smith	Corowa Rovers	12
1940	Azzi Medal	Gerry O’Neill	Chiltern	16	Harry Salmon	Howlong	12
1941-44	World War 2						
1945	Azzi Medal	Harry Salmon	Howlong	17	R. Bob Sharman	Barnawartha	12
1946	Azzi Medal	Harry Salmon	Howlong	14	A Peake	Chiltern	8
1947	Huggins Medal	Brian O'Shaunessy	Lavington	14	Norm Minns	Chiltern	12
1948	Huggins Medal	R. Bob Sharman	Chiltern	17	Stan Romeo	Lavington	16
1949	Huggins Medal	John Ziebarth	Howlong	29	R. Bob Sharman	Chiltern	23
1950	Huggins Medal	K Greenshields	Springhurst	32	John Ziebarth	Howlong	24
1951	Huggins Medal	R. Bob Sharman	Chiltern	16	John Ziebarth	Howlong	14
1952	Huggins Medal	Rob Bocquet	Howlong	21	Jack Hennessy	South Albury	18
1953	Huggins Medal	Ron Howes	Chiltern	?	Alan Curtis	Lavington	?
1954	Huggins Medal	Jack Dinsdale	Springhurst	22	John Voss	Wahgunyah	20
1955	Huggins Medal	John Voss	Wahgunyah	24	Jack Dinsdale	Springhurst	16&1/2
1956	Huggins Medal	John Voss	Wahgunyah	27&1/2	A T "Ossie" Kimball	Bethanga	15

The C&DFA - Azzi Medal was initially donated by Mr. Kelly Joseph Azzi. Mr. Azzi was the Balldale FC Delegate and C&DFA Vice President back in 1939. When Balldale FC joined the Hume Football League in 1947, Mr. Azzi then donated the inaugural best and fairest award medal in the Hume Football League and the award has remained as the Azzi Medal ever since. The Huggins Medal was donated by Mr. Mervyn C Huggins, the C&DFA President.

== Notable C&DFA Records ==
Notable Records
Record		Details	Year
Highest Score	297 Points	Chiltern 47.15 - 297 (v Springhurst)	1950
Most Goals in a Match	24 Goals	Gerry O'Neill: Chiltern v Springhurst	1950
Most Goals in a Season	139 Goals	Gerry O'Neill: Chiltern FC	1950
Most Consecutive Premierships	5	Chiltern FC	1947–1951
Most Consecutive Grand Finals	9	Chiltern FC	1945 - 1953
Highest Grand Final Score	20.22 - 144	Howlong FC	1939

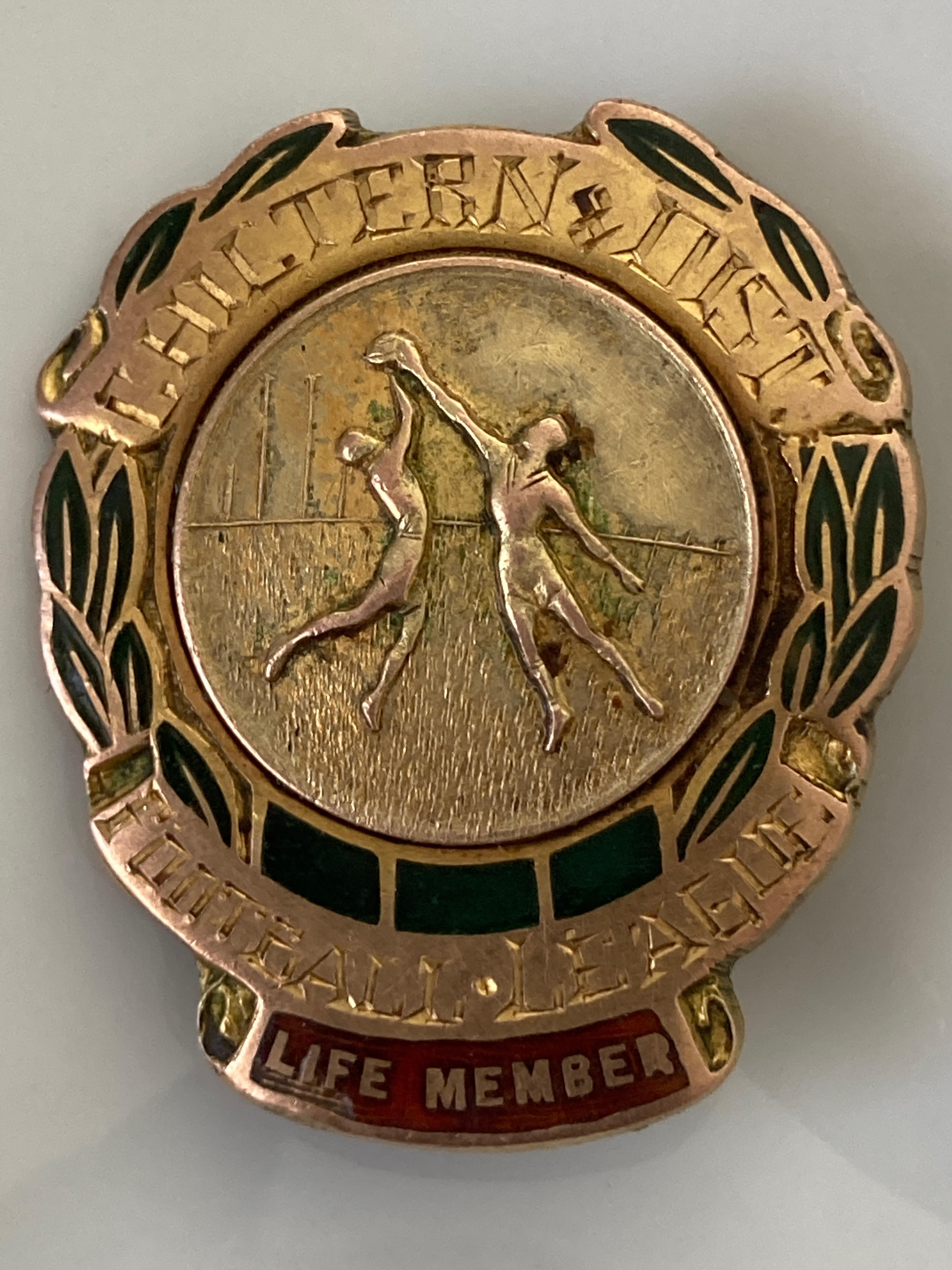
Chiltern & DFA - Life Membership Badge

== VFL Players ==
The following footballers played in the Chiltern & DFA prior to making their VFL debut, with the year indicating their VFL debut.

- 1920 - Percy Rowe - Christmastown to Lake Rovers (O&MFL) to Collingwood.
- 1930 - Frank Wells - Chiltern to North Melbourne
- 1930 - L Williamson - Chiltern to St. Kilda Reserves
- 1942 - Frank Anderson - Balldale to North Melbourne
- 1943 - Gerry O'Neal - Chiltern to Footscray
- 1944 - Les Gregory - Howlong to Carlton
- 1947 - Laurie Raine - Chiltern to Footscray
- 1954 - Jim Forsyth - Chiltern to Carlton Reserves

== Chiltern & DFA - Life Members ==
- Mervyn C. Huggins
