= Wodonga Football Club =

Australian rules football and netball club

Wodonga

Names
- Full name: Wodonga Football Netball Club Ltd
- Nickname: Bulldogs

2025 season
- After finals: 6th
- Home-and-away season: 6th
- Leading goalkicker: Noah Spiteri (52)
- Best and fairest: Adam Jorgensen

Club details
- Founded: 1878; 148 years ago
- Colours
- Competition: Ovens & Murray Football League
- President: Danny Cohen
- Coach: Jarrod Twitt & Jack O’Sullivan
- Premierships: (7): 1967, 1969, 1981, 1987, 1990, 1992, 2004
- Grounds: Martin Park (Main Oval)
- Les Cheesley Oval (No.2 Oval)

Uniforms
Home

Other information
- Official website: Wodonga FNC website

The Wodonga Football Netball Club, nicknamed the Bulldogs, is an Australian rules football and netball club based in the city of Wodonga, Victoria.

== History ==
Wodonga's first recorded match was against the Albury Football Club on Saturday, 6 July 1878 in Wodonga. Between 1878 and 1891, Wodonga played many intermittent friendly matches against other local club's and towns, before organised fixtures and competitions were starting to be arranged from the early 1890s.

In 1886, the Wodonga Junior Football Club played Chiltern in a very rough match, with T Powell captaining the winning Wodonga side and in 1887, Wodonga Junior's journeyed to and were beaten by Chiltern. Walter Pemberton captained the side.

In 1891, Wodonga "Starlights" played in a series of matches against Albury United, Chiltern, Osborne's Flat and Wagga Wagga.

In 1893 Wodonga played in a series of matches against, Albury, Barnawartha, Corowa Federals, Osborne's Flat and Wangaratta.

At the club's 1895 Annual General Meeting at the Terminus Hotel, the following gentlemen were voted in – Mr. R H Smyth (President), Mr. George Bodycomb (Honorary Secretary) and Mr. George Leighton (Honorary Treasurer).

In 1899, the Wodonga FC – "Starlights" junior club was reformed and adopted the club colours of blue, black and a white star. The club patrons were Joseph Hoddinott MLA, and Isaac Isaacs MLA. This team went on to win the Fagan Trophy premiership (Donor – Chris Fagan – Market Hotel, Albury).

In 1900, the Wodonga FC – "Starlights" played in the Albury Football Association and finished in third position.

In 1903, 1904 and 1905, the Wodonga FC – "Shamrocks" entered a team in the local Federal Junior Football Association. They were runners up to the Albury "Endeavours" in 1904 and to the "Britons" in 1905.

In April 1906, the Wodonga FC – "Shamrocks" met and decided to become a senior team and be known as just the Wodonga FC.

The Wodonga FC senior team played in the Border Football Association (BFA) in 1901, 1902, 1903 and also in 1906. In May, 1907 the BFA was wound up after being in debt and "in a state of muddle".

Wodonga FC played in the Wednesday Half Holiday Football Association in 1908 and were runners up to the Albury Catholic Young Men's FC (CYM) on the Albury Sports Ground.

After winning the 1909 – Twomey / Stewart Football Association Premiership, in early 1910, Wodonga FC attempted to form a local football association, but due to a lack of commitment, Wodonga FC were left with no official competition in 1910. They did manage to play some friendly matches with other local clubs during the 1910 season.

In 1911, Wodonga FC applied to both the Ovens & Murray Junior Football Association and the Rutherglen & District Football Association to play in these competitions, but were both rejected due to other club's opinion that the travel would be too far. In 1911 Wodonga played their home matches at Wodonga Park. The Albury Senior Football Association was established in 1911, in which Wodonga FC entered and were runners up to the Catholic Young Men's FC (CYM) again!

The club first played in the Chiltern & District Football Association in 1912 (runners up), 1913 and 1915 and also from 1930 to 1935, prior to joining the Ovens & Murray League in 1936.

In 1913 the club arranged for 100 membership tickets to be printed in the club colours – blue and black!

In 1914, Wodonga FC played in the Wodonga and District Football Association against – Bethanga, Federal Railways, Sandy Creek and Tallangatta. Wodonga finished second on the ladder to premiers, Federal Railways.

In 1914, the Wodonga Military FC was formed, with W Twomey appointed as president. They played matches against Albury Battery FC and Albury Infantry FC in 1914 and 1915.

In 1917 the Wodonga Cadets played the Chiltern Cadets in three games of football.

In 1921, Wodonga lost to Diggers in the Albury & Border Football Association Preliminary Final. In 1921 Wodonga had both an A team and a B team, with the B team playing their first game against Bowna at the Racecourse Oval.

At the club's 1924 AGM, under financial difficulties, the Wodonga FC applied for admission into the Kiewa Football Association, but were rejected. It appears that the Wodonga FC went into recess at this time, mainly due to a lack of community support and financial debt.

In 1924, the Wodonga Rovers FC was formed and this new club entered the Chiltern & District Football Association and had a reasonable amount of success, winning a premiership in 1926 and being runners up in 1927 (minor premiers) and 1928.

At a meeting of the Wodonga Rovers FC on Tuesday, 16 April 1929, the committee voted to alter the club's name to the "Wodonga Football Club" and entered the Tallangatta Football Association, for one year, then returns to the Chiltern & DFL in 1930.

In 1932, Wodonga's H. Scott shared the Chiltern & District Football Association best and fairest trophy, with Arthur Costin – Howlong FC.

In the 1933 Chiltern & District Football Association's grand final, Wodonga defeated Beechworth Wanderers. Wodonga's Clive Bohr was judged as the best and fairest player in the grand final.

In 1934 C W Randell, donated a gold medal for the club's best and fairest winner, which was won by ?

At the start of the 1935 season, Wodonga FC applied for a clearance from the Chiltern & District Football Association to the Albury District Football League, but were refused. They remained in the Chiltern & DFL and went onto win the premiership, defeating Kiewa at Barnawartha on Saturday, 26 October. Wodonga remained undefeated throughout the year, winning 24 consecutive matches by the end of the season.

In 1936 the club order 24 white felt monograms for the club jumpers, with WFC on them. and in 1937 they were known as the "Maroons".

In 1936 and 1937, Colin Wilcox from Wodonga FC played reserves with Melbourne Football Club, before moving across to Williamstown Football Club, where he played 173 games, was a premiership player in 1939, 1945 and 1949. He won the 1938 and 1948 best and fairest and was later selected in Williamstown's Team of the Century on the half back flank. He served in World War II with the RAAF.

The club joined the Ovens & Murray League in 1936 after a committee meeting on Monday, 23 March 1936. Wodonga FC finished third, losing the preliminary final to eventual premiers, Wangaratta Football Club. Crackerjack full forward, Fred Matthews, who kicked 113 goals in Wodonga's 1935 Chiltern and District Football Association premiership year, then kicked 123 goals for Wodonga in 1936. Fred was signed by the Melbourne Football Club and played three reserves games with them in early 1937, kicking 29 goals. Matthews coached Barnawartha in 1938, before returning to Wodonga and played in their 1939 O&MFL grand final loss to Albury. He would later die in World War II in 1943, while serving his country with the RAAF, when his Wellington Bomber plane went down in a fierce snowstorm in England.

In 1940, Wodonga entered a second eighteen team in the Chiltern & District Football Association and lost the first semi final to Barnawartha Football Club. The Chiltern & District Football Association then went into recess between 1941 and 1944 due to World War II.

In 1945, the Wodonga Football Club entered a team in the Border Football Association and competed against other local clubs, Catholic Young Men, East Albury, Lavington, North Albury and South Albury. Wodonga were defeated by South Albury in the grand final at the Albury Sportsground. Dudley "Doug" Probyn (Captain / Coach) won the club best and fairest award and the Border Mail Medal in 1945.

In 1946, the Ovens and Murray Football League reformed and Wodonga rejoined along with the following club's – Albury, Benalla, Border United, Rutherglen, Wangaratta and Yarrawonga. Wodonga lost the Preliminary Final to Albury on the Wangaratta Showgrounds to finish third in their return to the O&MFL.

There appears to be no Wodonga team in the Chiltern & District Football Association in 1945 and 1946, but in 1947 there was a Wodonga Ex Servicemen's Football Club that played in the Chiltern & District Football Association and lost the Preliminary Final to Howlong at Lavington. Then in 1948, Wodonga Rovers Football Club reformed and they played in the Chiltern & District Football Association and lost the preliminary final to the Howlong Football Club. Both these teams were not directing related to the Wodonga FC, but it does indicate that football in Wodonga was getting stronger after the war, to warrant having two senior teams in the town. Wodonga Rovers competed in the Chiltern & DFA between 1948 and 1952. In 1953 when the Ovens & Murray League introduced a Seconds football competition, Wodonga Rovers left the Chiltern & DFA and entered the O&MFL Seconds as "Wodonga".

Around 1949, Wodonga FC set up a Provident Fund for injured players to be compensated if they were not able to work for a length of time.

In 1953, the Wodonga "Thirds" won the Albury Midgets Football League Under 15 premiership when they defeated West Albury.

In March 1954, the Wodonga FC decided to enter a third team in the Albury and Border Junior Football League and the competition age limit was reduced from 21 years to 18 years.

Wodonga made three consecutive Ovens & Murray League grand finals, winning in 1967 & 1969 (losing to Corowa Football Club in 1968), coached by former Collingwood Football Club player, Mick Bone and they played in four consecutive grand finals in 1992 (premiers), 1993, 1994 and 1995, but lost the last three.

The club's Thirds / Under 18 side played in eleven consecutive grand finals between 1977 and 1987, winning seven premierships in a period of dominance, when Wodonga was a real powerhouse in the Ovens & Murray League. The Thirds then played in seven consecutive grand finals between 2001 and 2007, winning five.

In 1980, Wodonga Thirds player, Craig Powell (Cleary) was the first O&MFL Under 18 footballer to kick 100 goals in a season.

In 1981, Wodonga achieved the rare feat of winning football premierships in the firsts, seconds and thirds. No other team has done this.

In 1991, the club made, but later withdrew, a bid to join the Victorian Football Association.

In 1993 the Ovens & Murray League introduced a netball competition, with A & B Grade initially.

Wodonga Bulldogs seniors broke a number hoodoos in the 2023 season, beating Wangaratta Magpies at Wangaratta for the first time since 2014 and making/winning a final for the first time in 14 seasons. The 2023 season saw new recruits Jack Yelland, Matt Sorozynski and Bailey Griffith don the maroon for the first time. The bulldogs finish 5th, with 8 wins and 8 loses in 2023.

== Football Competitions ==
Wodonga Football Club have played in the following competitions –

- Johnson's Football Association (Donor – Johnson's Waterloo Hotel, Yackandandah)
  - 1896
- The Weis Trophy (Donor – Karl Weis' Saloon, Wodonga).
  - 1897
- The Alty's Football Trophy Association (Donor – Alty's Royal Hotel, Yackandandah)
  - 1898
- The Simons / Loveridge Football Association
  - 1900
- Border Football Association
  - 1901 – 1903 & 1906.
- Federal Junior Football Association
  - 1903, 1904 & 1905
- Wednesday Half Holiday Football Association
  - 1908
- Twomey / Stewart Football Association
  - 1909
- Chiltern & District Football Association
  - 1912 and 1913
- Wodonga District Football Association
  - 1914
- Chiltern & District Football Association
  - 1915
- World War I, club in recess
  - 1916, 1917 and 1918
- Albury & Border Football Association
  - 1919 to 1923
- Chiltern & District Football Association
  - 1924 to 1928 (Wodonga Rovers FC)
- Tallangatta & District Football Association
  - 1929
- Chiltern & District Football Association
  - 1930 to 1935
- Ovens & Murray Football League
  - 1936 to 1940
- World War II, club in recess
  - 1941 to 1944
- Border Football Association
  - 1945
- Ovens & Murray Football League
  - 1946 to present day

== Senior Football Premierships ==
- Twomey & Stewart Association Trophy
  - 1909
- Chiltern & District Football Association
  - 1926, 1933, 1935 – undefeated.
- Ovens & Murray Football League (7)
  - 1967, 1969, 1981, 1987, 1990, 1992, 2004

== Senior Football Runners Up ==
- Wednesday Half Holiday Football Association
  - 1908
- Albury Senior Football Association
  - 1911
- Chiltern & District Football Association
  - 1912, 1915, 1927 – (minor premiers), 1928, 1931 – (minor premiers), 1934.
- Wodonga & District Football Association
  - 1914
- Border Football Association
  - 1945
- Ovens & Murray Football League
  - 1939, 1951, 1958, 1960, 1968, 1979, 1984, 1989, 1993, 1994, 1995, 2003

== Reserves Football – Premierships ==
- Ovens & Murray Football League (19)
  - 1956, 1957, 1960, 1961, 1969, 1970, 1971, 1979, 1981, 1987, 1989, 1990, 1993, 1994, 1995, 2001, 2004, 2005, 2006.

== Reserves Football – Runners Up ==
- Ovens & Murray Football League (10)
  - 1967, 1968, 1976, 1980, 1986, 1988, 1992, 2002, 2009, 2015.

== Thirds / Under 18's Premierships ==
- Ovens & Murray Football League
  - 1977, 1978, 1979, 1981, 1982, 1986, 1987, 1991, 2001, 2005, 2006, 2007,

== Thirds / Under 18's Runners Up ==
- Fagan's Trophy (Donor – Chris Fagan – Market Hotel, Albury)
  - 1899
- Federal Junior Football Association
  - 1904, 1905
- Ovens & Murray Football League
  - 1975, 1980, 1983, 1984, 1985, 1992, 1995, 2002, 2003, 2015.

== Ovens & Murray Football League – Senior Football Best & Fairest Award – Morris Medal Winners ==
- 1938: Kelt Emery
- 1939: Gordon Strang Polled the most votes, with 20, but was suspended by the O&MFL Tribunal during the season, but was presented with a Morris Medal Trophy. Bill Francis (Rutherglen) won with 17 votes.
- 1940: Gordon Strang
- 1949: Jack Eames
- 1952: Norm Webb
- 1967: Gary Williamson
- 1989: Brett Allen
- 1992: Steven Murphy
- 2016: Matthew Seiter
- 2019: Jarrod Hodgkin

== Ovens & Murray Football League – Reserves Football Best & Fairest Award ==
- Ralph Marks Medal – 1953 to 1970
  - 1956: K Adamson
  - 1958: B McKoy
- Leo Burke Medal – 1970 onwards
  - 1976: K Keating
  - 1977: Bruce Calder
  - 1978: Bruce Calder
  - 1983: S Brown
  - 1984: C Reynolds
  - 1992: B Smith
  - 1993: C Baker
  - 2005: G Mathey

== Ovens & Murray Football League – Under 18's – Football Best & Fairest ==
- 1975 – Steven Hedley
- 1979 – John Pennington
- 1982 – Ian McGregor
- 2001 – Ryan McEvoy
- 2007 – Brenton Olsen

== Club Football Best and Fairest Winners ==
Year	Seniors	Reserves	Thirds	Comments
1933	Claude Higginson			
1934	H McKoy			
1935	Colin Wilcox			
1936	Carl Wegener			O&MFL
1937	Lloyd McCullough			
1938	Kelt Emery			
1939	Gordon Strang			
1940	Gordon Strang			
1941–44				Club in recess. WW2
1945	Dudley Probyn			Border FA
1946	A Muir			O&MFL
1947	Doug Wright			
1948	Jim Quirk			
1949	Jack Eames			
1950	Herb Watkins			
1951	Stan Rule			
1952	Norm Webb			
1953	Frank Elkington			O&M 2nds commenced in '53
1954	Frank Elkington			
1955	Geoff Feehan			
1956	Edward Faithfull			
1957	Des Healey			
1958	Brian Gilchrist			
1959	Brian Gilchrist			
1960	Brian Gilchrist			
1961	Brian Hoffman			
1962	Colin Jarvis			
1963	John Perry			
1964	Ron Harvey			
1965	Brian Gilchrist			
1966	Brian Gilchrist			
1967	Gary Williamson			
1968	Ken Goyne			
1969	Gary Williamson			
1970	Vin Doolan			
1971	John Cole			
1972	Rod Whiteway			
1973	Ron Hill	Steve Doolan & Peter Shadbolt		O&M 3rds commenced in '73
1974	Des Richardson	Noel Crossman	Rick Costelloe	
1975	Jim Britton			
1976	Jim Britton			
1977	Jim Britton			
1978	Steven Hedley			
1979	Peter Ohlin			
1980	Jonathan Collins			
1981	Garry Wheeler			
1982	Peter Sharp			
1983	Chris Perry			
1984	Ernie Whitehead			
1985	David Wortmann			
1986	Jeff Gieschen			
1987	Gary McGhee			
1988	Brett Allen			
1989	Ernie Whitehead			
1990	Drew Pevitt			
1991	Darren Harris		Adrian Whitehead	
1992	Stephen Murphy			
1993	Graham Mathey			
1994	Dean Stone &			
	Jason McInness			
1995	Damien Condon			
1996	Graham Mathey			
1997	Michael McGregor			
1998	Brad Thompson			
1999	Brad Thompson			
2000	Darren Bradshaw			
2001	Paul Nugent			
2002	Brad Thompson			
2003	Brad Thompson			
2004	Matthew Shir			
2005	Simon McCormack			
2006	Simon McCormack			
2007	Matthew Shir			
2008	Matthew Shir			
2009	Jarrod Twitt			
2010	Jarrod Twitt			
2011	Josh Hicks			
2012	Tyson Groupic			
2013	Ben Hollands	Beau Elkington &	Jack Elkington	
		Mason Brown		
2014	Ben Hollands &			
	John Pratt			
2015	Matt Seiter	Bob Russell	Harry McKimmie	
2016	Matt Seiter	Reed Jackson	Connor Brodie	
2017	Jarrod Hodgkin	Nick English	Connor Brodie	
2018	Josh Hicks	Jack Stefani		
2019	Dylan Beattie	Clayton Bosman	Josh Mathey	
2020				O&M in recess. COVID-19
2021	Josh Mathey			
2022	Angus Baker	Reed Jackson	Denis Mutsinzi	
2023	Josh Mathey	Jack Chessar	Rueben Bourke	
2024	Josh Mathey	Jack Mathey	James Grohman	
2025	Adam Jorgerson	Jack Gilbee	Jed Hodgkin	
Year	Seniors	Reserves	Thirds	Comments

== Club Football Coaches ==
Year	Seniors	Reserves	Thirds	Comments
1930	Fred Schnelle			Chiltern & DFA
1931	Jim Walsh			
1932	Jim Walsh			
1933	Jim Walsh			
1934	Laurie Mortimer			
1935	Laurie Mortimer			
1936	W Anderson			O&MFL
1937	S Grenell			
1938	S Grenell			
1939	Gordon Strang			
1940	Gordon Strang			
1941-44				In recess > WW2
1945	Dudley Probyn			Border FA
1946	Dudley Probyn			O&MFL
1947	Jack Eames			
1948	Jack Eames			
1949	Jack Eames			
1950	Jack Eames			
1951	Stan Rule			
1952	Stan Rule			
1953	Stan Rule			
1954	Don Calder			
1955	Don Calder			
1956	Don Calder			
1957	Des Healey			
1958	Des Healey			
1959	Des Healey			
1960	Des Healey			
1961	Lionel Ryan			
1962	Lionel Ryan			
1963	Lionel Ryan			
1964	Ron Harvey			
1965	Ron Harvey			
1966	Ron Harvey			
1967	Mick Bone			
1968	Mick Bone			
1969	Mick Bone			
197				

== Wodonga FC players who played in the VFL (pre draft) ==
The following footballers played football with Wodonga, prior to playing senior football in the VFL, with the year indicating their VFL debut.

- 1941 – Gerald Tanner – Richmond
- 1954 – Don Star – South Melbourne
- 1957 – Percy Appleyard – South Melbourne
- 1957 – Geoff Feehan – St. Kilda
- 1964 – John Perry – Richmond
- 1966 – Mike Andrews – Fitzroy
- 1968 - Barry McKenzie – Fitzroy
- 1971 – Vin Doolan – North Melbourne
- 1972 - Neil Brown - North Melbourne
- 1973 - David Craig - North Melbourne
- 1976 – Xavier Tanner – North Melb & Melbourne
- 1980 – Danny Murphy – North Melbourne
- 1983 – Jonathan Collins – North Melb & St. Kilda
- 1983 – Steven Hedley – Sydney Swans
- 1986 – David Ceglar – North Melbourne
- 1988 – Michael Garvey – Carlton
- 1991 - Robbie West - West Coast Eagles
- 1994 - Adrian Whitehead - Carlton
- 1996 - Danial Bradshaw - Brisbane Lions
- 1998 - Joel McKay - Geelong
- 1999 - Glenn Bowyer - Hawthorn
- 2002 - Darren Bradshaw - Brisbane Lions
- 2009 – Jack Ziebell – North Melbourne
- 2014 - Kayne Turner – North Melbourne
- 2020 – Elijah Hollands – Gold Coast
- 2020 - Harrison Jones - Hawthorn
- 2022 – Oliver Hollands – Carlton

Check out the "External links" section at the bottom of this page for a list of former Wodonga players drafted to an AFL club from 1987 onwards.

== VFL / AFL footballers who have come to play at the Wodonga FC ==
The following footballers have come to play with Wodonga FC, with senior football experience from an VFL / AFL club. The year indicates their debut with Wodonga FC.

- 1939 – Gordon Strang – Richmond
- 1945 – Dudley Probyn – St. Kilda
- 1947 – Jack Eames – Richmond
- 1951 – Stan Rule – Melbourne
- 1952 – Norm Webb – Footscray
- 1954 – Don Calder – Carlton
- 1956 – Des Healey – Collingwood
- 1961 – Lionel Ryan – Footscray
- 1966 – Gary Williamson – Richmond
- 1967 – Dick Grimmond – Richmond
- 1967 – Mick Bone – Collingwood
- 1974 – Ron Montgomery – North Melbourne
- 1976 – Frank Hodgkin – St. Kilda
- 1980 – Neil Brown – North Melbourne
- 1981 – David McLeish – South Melbourne
- 1982 – Chris Perry – Collingwood
- 1982 – Garry Wheeler – Footscray
- 1986 – Jeff Gieschen – Footscray
- 1990 – Graeme Cordy – Footscray
- 1992 – Mark Stockdale – Richmond
- 1993 – Neil Cordy – Footscray & Sydney Swans
- 1994 – Dean Harding – Fitzroy
- 1994 – Robert Hickmott – Melbourne
- 1996 – Darren Dennerman – Geelong & Sydney Swans
- 1999 – Leon Higgins – Sydney Swans & Hawthorn
- 2003 – Ben Hollands – Richmond
- 2004 – Matthew Shir – Adelaide Crows
- 2007 – David Antonowicz – West Coast Eagles
