= Michael Garvey =

Michael Garvey may refer to:

- Michael Garvey (Australian footballer) (born 1965), Australian rules footballer
- Michael Garvey (rugby league) (born 1988), American rugby league player
- Mike Garvey (born 1962), American stock car racing driver
- Mick Garvey (Benidorm), a character in Benidorm
- Michael Garvey, a character in Benidorm
