= Martin Cross (footballer) =

Australian rules footballer

Personal information
- Born: 19 October 1939 (age 87)
- Original team: North Ballarat
- Debut: 1961, Carlton vs. St Kilda, at Junction Oval

Playing career^{1}
Years	Club	Games (Goals)
1961–1963	Carlton	36 (36)
- ^{1} Playing statistics correct to the end of 1963.

Martin Cross (born 19 October 1939) is a former Australian rules footballer who played in the Victorian Football League (VFL).

Martin Cross joined Carlton in 1961 from North Ballarat, Where he played 96 games in the Ballarat League prior to crossing to Carlton.

He was a right-foot kick who baulked and turned well, and had all the requirements of a top-class rover.

Cross was 20th man in the 1962 Carlton Grand Final team, that was beaten by Essendon by 32 points.

Between 1966 and 1971 and 1976 and 1977, Cross was captain-coach of Myrtleford in the Ovens & Murray League, steering them to a premiership in 1970. Cross also coached Myrtleford in 1992 and 1993. Cross also coached North Albury.

His grandson Ben Hollands and great-grandsons Elijah Hollands and Oliver (Ollie) Hollands also played professional Australian rules football, with Elijah drafted to the Gold Coast Suns in 2020 and Ollie drafted to Carlton in 2022. As of 2024 Elijah also plays for Carlton.
