= Edward Jackson (footballer) =

Australian rules footballer (1925–1996)

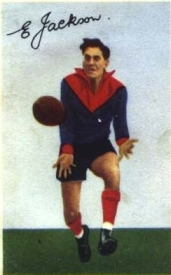

Personal information
- Born: 16 March 1925
- Died: 5 February 1996 (aged 70)
- Original teams: Echuca, Echuca East FC
- Height: 175 cm (5 ft 9 in)
- Weight: 70 kg (154 lb)

Playing career^{1}
Years	Club	Games (Goals)
1947–1952	Melbourne	84 (10)
- ^{1} Playing statistics correct to the end of 1952.

Career highlights
- Melbourne premiership player 1948

Edward "Ted" Jackson (16 March 1925 – 5 February 1996) was an Australian rules football player in the Victorian Football League (VFL). Edwards was one of few league players of Indigenous Australian heritage in the 1940s.

Jackson's father, Eddie Jackson Senior was a country footballer and premiership coach in the 1920s and 1930s.

Jackson played in Echuca's losing 1945 Echuca Football League grand final side.

Jackson was a member of Echuca East Football Club's losing 1946 Echuca Football League grand final side, which was coached by his father, Eddie Jackson Senior.

At the end of the 1947, "Clubman", the Weekly Times football correspondent rated ex-Echuca Melbourne player, Eddie Jackson, the best of all of the first-year "former country players" in that year's VFL Competition: the second-best was the ex-Wycheproof Collingwood player, Alex Denney, and the third-best was the ex-Granya Footscray player, Norm Webb.

He played in Melbourne's winning premiership team in the 1948 VFL Grand Final and also played in the 1948 drawn VFL grand final, the week before.

In 1952, Jackson played in an Aboriginal All Stars team against Carrum at Frankston.

Jackson played with Tongala in the Goulburn Valley Football League in 1953, then with Echuca in 1954.

Jackson won both the 1954 Bendigo Football League best and fairest award, the Michelsen Medal and the Echuca FC best and fairest too. Jackson was a member of Echuca's losing preliminary final side in 1954.

In 1955, Jackson was captain-coach of Yea in the Waranga North East Football Association.

In 1956, Jackson played half a season with the Imperials Football Club in the Sunraysia Football League and represented the Sunraysia FL against the Ovens & Murray Football League prior to being transferred with work at the State Electricity Commission (SEC) to Mornington, Victoria.

Jackson was captain-coach of Alexandra Football Club in 1958 and 1959 in the Waranga North East Football Association and was a member of Alexandra's 1960 Waranga North East Football Association premiership team.

Jackson was captain-coach of Thornton Eildon when they won the 1961 Waranga North East Football Association premiership. Jackson was captain-coach again in 1962 and assistant coach/player in 1963 at Thornton Eildon.
