= Oliver Hollands =

Personal information
- Nickname: dutchy
- Born: 16 January 2004 (age 22)
- Original team: Wodonga/Murray Bushrangers
- Draft: No. 11, 2022 national draft
- Height: 184 cm (6 ft 0 in)
- Weight: 72 kg (159 lb)
- Position: Midfielder / defender

Club information
- Current club: Carlton
- Number: 4

Playing career^{1}
Years	Club	Games (Goals)
2023–	Carlton	76 (12)
- ^{1} Playing statistics correct to the end of round 22, 2026.

Career highlights
- AFL Rising Star nominee: 2023

Oliver Hollands (born 16 January 2004) is an Australian rules footballer who plays for the Carlton Football Club in the Australian Football League (AFL). He is the younger brother of Carlton teammate and former Gold Coast player Elijah Hollands.

Hollands, son of former Richmond footballer Ben Hollands, attended Geelong Grammar and played his early football for the Wodonga Bulldogs. Prior to being drafted to Carlton, Hollands had an All-Australian season for Vic Country (Under-18s). At the draft combine he was equal first in the two-kilometre time trial and was selected by Carlton with the 11th pick of the 2022 national draft. His great-grandfather, Martin Cross, had also played for Carlton.

== Statistics ==
Updated to the end of round 22, 2026.

Legend
G	Goals	K	Kicks	D	Disposals	T	Tackles
B	Behinds	H	Handballs	M	Marks

Season	Team	No.	Games	Totals							Averages (per game)							Votes
Season	Team	No.	Games	G	B	K	H	D	M	T	G	B	K	H	D	M	T	Votes
2023	Carlton	14	19	2	4	163	103	266	58	48	0.1	0.2	8.6	5.4	14.0	3.1	2.5	0
2024	Carlton	4	23	5	4	203	119	322	87	79	0.2	0.2	8.8	5.2	14.0	3.8	3.4	0
2025	Carlton	4	23	4	2	260	179	439	115	75	0.2	0.1	11.3	7.8	19.1	5.0	3.3	0
2026	Carlton	4	11	1	1	121	63	184	60	35	0.1	0.1	11.0	5.7	16.7	5.5	3.2	0
Career			76	12	11	747	464	1211	320	237	0.2	0.1	9.8	6.1	15.9	4.2	3.1	0
