= Don Star =

Australian rules footballer

Personal information
- Full name: Donald Malcolm Star
- Born: 5 September 1931
- Died: 10 May 2026 (aged 94)
- Original teams: Granya, Wodonga
- Height: 178 cm (5 ft 10 in)
- Weight: 82 kg (181 lb)

Playing career^{1}
Years	Club	Games (Goals)
1954–55	South Melbourne	20 (16)
- ^{1} Playing statistics correct to the end of 1955.

Donald Malcolm Star (5 September 1931 – 10 May 2026) was an Australian rules footballer who played with South Melbourne in the Victorian Football League (VFL).

Star made his debut for Granya as a 13 year old in 1945 and played in back to back Tallangatta & District Football League premierships with Granya in 1946 and 1947. Star then played with Wodonga in the Ovens & Murray Football League from 1950 to 1952, then returned to play with Granya in 1953, before moving down to play with South Melbourne in 1954 and 1955.

Star returned home to work on the family farm and played with Wodonga under Des Healey, before accepting the role as captain-coach of Jindera in the Hume Football League. Star ended up playing 124 senior games for Wodonga FC before playing with Jindera. Star lead them to the 1960 and 1961 premierships. Star then played in two more Jindera premierships in 1963 and 1964 under coach, Bill Barton. All up, Star estimates he would play more than 350 senior games during his career.
