= Garry Wheeler =

Australian rules footballer

Personal information
- Full name: Garry Joseph Wheeler
- Born: 18 July 1956
- Died: 25 January 1982 (aged 25)
- Original team: Warburton
- Height: 174 cm (5 ft 9 in)
- Weight: 71 kg (157 lb)

Playing career^{1}
Years	Club	Games (Goals)
1976, 1978	Footscray	5 (3)
- ^{1} Playing statistics correct to the end of 1978.

Garry Joseph Wheeler (18 July 1956 – 25 January 1982) was an Australian rules footballer who played with Footscray in the Victorian Football League (VFL).

Gary played with Wodonga Football Club and won their best and fairest award in 1981.

Gary was the younger brother of Terry Wheeler.
