= Neil Brown (footballer) =

Australian rules footballer

Personal information
- Full name: Neil Brown
- Born: 21 April 1952
- Died: 9 September 2014 (aged 62)
- Original teams: Wodonga, Albury
- Height: 194 cm (6 ft 4 in)
- Weight: 92 kg (203 lb)

Playing career^{1}
| Years | Club | Games (Goals) |
| 1972 | North Melbourne | 2 (0) |
- ^{1} Playing statistics correct to the end of 1972.

Neil Brown (21 April 1952 – 9 September 2014) was an Australian rules footballer who played with North Melbourne in the Victorian Football League (VFL).

A school teacher, he attempted to transfer from North Melbourne to South Melbourne, but instead played for Coburg when the clearance was blocked. He later returned to Wodonga where he played cricket and football for Wodonga, as well as football for Wangaratta.
