= David Ceglar =

Australian rules footballer

Personal information
- Born: 14 June 1966 (age 60)
- Original team: Wodonga (O&MFL)
- Debut: 1986
- Height: 195 cm (6 ft 5 in)
- Weight: 99 kg (218 lb)

Playing career^{1}
Years	Club	Games (Goals)
1986–1987	North Melbourne	7 (2)
- ^{1} Playing statistics correct to the end of 1987.

David Ceglar (born 14 June 1966) is a former Australian rules footballer who played in the Victorian Football League during the 1980s. He played 7 games for North Melbourne between 1986 and 1987. He was recruited from Wodonga.

His son John Ceglar played for Geelong, Collingwood and Hawthorn.
