= Matthew Shir =

Australian rules footballer

Personal information
- Full name: Matthew Shir
- Born: 12 September 1981 (age 45)
- Original team: Benalla / Murray Bushrangers
- Draft: 83rd, 1999 National Draft
- Height: 184 cm (6 ft 0 in)
- Weight: 83 kg (183 lb)

Playing career^{1}
Years	Club	Games (Goals)
2001–2002	Adelaide	11 (1)
2003	Richmond	0 (0)
Total		11 (1)
- ^{1} Playing statistics correct to the end of 2003.

Matthew Shir (born 12 September 1981) is an Australian rules footballer who played with the Adelaide Football Club in the Australian Football League (AFL).

Shir, a defender, was drafted by Adelaide from the Murray Bushrangers of the TAC Cup, although he was from Benalla originally. He was hampered by groin injuries during his time in Adelaide. At SANFL level he played for Glenelg.

Richmond secured him in the 2002 Rookie Draft, but he did not make any senior league appearances.

From 2004 to 2009 he played as a midfielder for Wodonga in the Ovens & Murray Football League. He won three club best and fairest awards and was a member of a premiership team in his first season, winning the O&MFL medal for best on ground in the 2004 grand final.

He made his way to Queensland in 2010 to play with Aspley.
