= Gerry O'Neill =

Australian rules footballer, born 1919

Personal information
- Full name: Gerald O'Neill
- Born: 13 April 1919; Chiltern, Victoria
- Died: 1 August 2004 (aged 85); Wangaratta, Victoria
- Original teams: Chiltern, North Footscray, Kingsville
- Height: 178 cm (5 ft 10 in)
- Weight: 73 kg (161 lb)

Playing career^{1}
Years	Club	Games (Goals)
1943–44	Footscray	16 (2)
- ^{1} Playing statistics correct to the end of 1944.

Career highlights
- Chiltern premiership player: 1936, 40, 47, 48, 49, 50, 51 & 53.; 1940 - C&DFA Azzi Medal; 1950 - C&DFA Leading Goalkicker: 139 goals; 1954 - O&KFL Leading Goalkicker: 87 goals

Gerry "Podge" O'Neill (13 April 1919 – 1 August 2004) was an Australian rules footballer who played with Footscray in the Victorian Football League (VFL).

O'Neill first played senior football with Chiltern in the Chiltern & District Football Association as a 17 year in 1936. He played in their 1936 and 1940 premiership teams and won the 1940 Chiltern & District Football Association best and fairest award, the Azzi Medal.

O'Neill then moved to Melbourne and played with North Footscray 1941, then with Kingsville in 1942.

O'Neill managed to play 16 games for Footscray during 1943 and 1944, after debuting against Carlton in round two, 1943.

O'Neill served in World War II, initially enlisting in the Australian Army in 1941 but transferring to the Royal Australian Air Force in 1943 where he served in the 2nd Airfield Construction Squadron. O'Neill played for Footscray during his period of war service.

O'Neill returned to play with Chiltern in 1947 and then played in Chiltern's 1947, 48, 49, 50, 51 and 53 Chiltern & District Football Association premierships. O'Neill was captain-coach of Chiltern from 1951 to 1953 and in 1954, when Chiltern joined the Ovens & King Football League.

In August 1950, O’Neill kicked 24 goals against Springhurst in round 16, to bring his goal tally to 116 for the season. O'Neill finished the 1950 season with 139 goals, after kicking nine goals in the grand final win against Howlong.

In the 1952 C&DFA grand final, O'Neill kicked nine goals against Corowa Stars Football Club, but Chiltern lost by 15 points.

In Chiltern's first year in the Ovens & King Football League in 1954, O'Neill was the leading goalkicker in the O&KFL, with 87 goals for the season, in which he retired at the end of the season, after a controversial grand final loss.

O'Neill was captain-coach of Chiltern that lost to Greta by four points in the 1954 O&KFL grand final, after being four goals in front after 35 minutes, with the last quarter going for a staggering 43 minutes.

His grandson is former AFL footballer from the Brisbane Bears, Nigel Lappin.
