= Stan Rule =

Australian rules footballer and coach

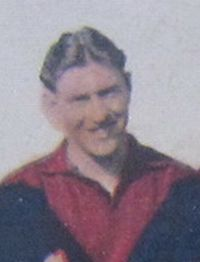

Personal information
- Full name: Stanley William Rule
- Born: 17 January 1924; Brighton, Victoria
- Died: 12 August 2007 (aged 83)
- Original team: Brighton Tech
- Height: 185 cm (6 ft 1 in)
- Weight: 86 kg (190 lb)
- Positions: Follower, defender

Playing career^{1}
Years	Club	Games (Goals)
1946–1950	Melbourne	74 (13)

Representative team honours
Years	Team	Games (Goals)
1949	Victoria	
- ^{1} Playing statistics correct to the end of 1950.

Stanley William Rule (17 January 1924 – 12 August 2007) was an Australian rules footballer who played with Melbourne in the Victorian Football League (VFL).

Rule enlisted in the Australian Army as soon as he turned eighteen and served until May 1946. He served overseas in both New Guinea and New Britain during his war years.

Rule, a Victorian interstate representative in 1949, was used as both a follower and defender at Melbourne. In their 1948 premiership team he was the former, while in 1946 he played from the back pocket in a losing Grand Final.

He went to Wodonga in 1951, as captain-coach. Rule then coached Holbrook Football Club in the Albury & District Football League from 1954 to 1955, leading them to a famous 1955 premiership win.
