= Ben Hollands =

Australian rules footballer

Personal information
- Full name: Ben Hollands
- Born: 12 January 1978 (age 48)
- Original team: North Albury
- Height: 177 cm (5 ft 10 in)
- Weight: 75 kg (165 lb)

Playing career^{1}
Years	Club	Games (Goals)
1999	Richmond	8 (5)
- ^{1} Playing statistics correct to the end of 1999.

Ben Hollands (born 12 January 1978) is an Australian rules footballer who played with Richmond in the Australian Football League (AFL).

== AFL career ==
Hollands, who played in the 1995 Teal Cup for New South Wales, was initially recruited by the Sydney Swans, from his club North Albury. He played only reserves football for Sydney. In 1998, Richmond added Hollands to their rookie list and the following year he was promoted to the senior list, playing eight AFL games that season. His most memorable game was a one-point win over Fremantle at Subiaco Oval, as Hollands kicked the winning goal, with just seconds remaining. He was rookie listed by Port Adelaide in 2001 but didn't make any AFL appearances for the club.

== SANFL ==
Hollands played 101 games for West Adelaide in the SANFL from 2000 to 2008. He won the Steve Hamra Medal in 2001 and was a dual Fos Williams Medal winner, in 2001 and 2002, for performances against Victoria.

== Ovens & Murray ==
Between his stints at West Adelaide, Hollands played with the Wodonga Bulldogs in the Ovens & Murray Football League and was a member of their 2004 premiership side. He began coaching the Bulldogs in the 2011 season.

== Personal life ==
Hollands' eldest son, Elijah, is also a professional Australian rules footballer who was drafted with the seventh pick in the 2020 AFL draft by the Gold Coast Suns and traded to the Carlton Football Club at the conclusion of the 2023 AFL season.

Hollands’ middle son Oliver (Ollie), was drafted to Carlton Football Club in 2022. The boys' grandfather Martin Cross also played for Carlton between 1961 and 1963. He was named to make his debut as part of the Carlton side for their round one encounter against Richmond, meaning that his debut game was for his grandfather's side against his father's side to start the 2023 AFL season.
