= Mick Bone =

Australian rules footballer

Personal information
- Full name: Michael Bone
- Born: 3 October 1942
- Original team: Thornbury YMCW
- Height: 168 cm (5 ft 6 in)
- Weight: 73 kg (161 lb)

Playing career^{1}
| Years | Club | Games (Goals) |
| 1962–1966 | Collingwood | 62 (55) |
- ^{1} Playing statistics correct to the end of 1966.

Michael Bone (born 3 October 1942) is a former Australian rules footballer who played with Collingwood in the Victorian Football League (VFL) during the 1960s.

Bone, who kicked four goals in his second VFL game, was recruited from Thornbury YMCW. Mainly used as a rover, he played all 21 games in 1964 and appeared in the 1964 VFL Grand Final loss to Melbourne.

He also had a long career in the Ovens & Murray Football League, playing 144 games for Wodonga. Bone captained and coached Wodonga to three consecutive Ovens and Murray Football League grand finals, winning premierships in both 1967 and 1969. (defeated by Corowa Football Club in 1968).

== Limks ==
KB On Reflection - Mick Bone article
