= Jack Eames =

Australian rules footballer

- Eames in 2009

Personal information
- Full name: Jack Eames
- Born: 22 December 1922; Albury, New South Wales
- Died: 16 January 2017 (aged 94)
- Original team: Albury
- Height: 183 cm (6 ft 0 in)
- Weight: 83 kg (183 lb)

Playing career^{1}
Years	Club	Games (Goals)
1946	Richmond	14 (1)
- ^{1} Playing statistics correct to the end of 1946.

Jack Eames (22 December 1922 – 16 January 2017) was an Australian rules footballer who played with Richmond in the Victorian Football League (VFL).

Eames was one of many present and future VFL footballers who served in World War II. He enlisted in the Australian Army in 1942 and served until he was discharged in 1946. A follower, he made himself available to VFL clubs prior to the 1946 season when he decided to move from his home in Albury, to Melbourne, for work purposes. Four clubs tried to get his signature and it was Richmond who were successful. However, he would spend only one season at Richmond, playing 14 games. He accepted an offer to captain-coach Wodonga in 1947 and returned home to the Ovens & Murray Football League. His performances in the 1949 season won him a Morris Medal.
