= Wally Scott (footballer) =

Australian rules footballer

Personal information
- Full name: Walter Francis Douglas Montague Scott
- Born: 28 June 1884; Stawell, Victoria
- Died: 3 November 1959 (aged 75); Heidelberg, Victoria
- Original team: Sherwood College
- Position: Wing

Playing career^{1}
| Years | Club | Games (Goals) |
| 1904–11 | St Kilda | 108 (4) |
- ^{1} Playing statistics correct to the end of 1911.

Walter Francis Douglas Montague "Wally" Scott (28 June 1884 – 3 November 1959) was an Australian rules footballer who played with St Kilda in the Victorian Football League (VFL).

Scott played in Granya Football Club's 1912 Tallangatta & Mitta Mitta Football Association premiership and was later wounded in World War One at the Dardanelles.
