= Gary Williamson (footballer) =

Australian rules footballer

- Gary Williamson in 1961

Personal information
- Full name: Gary Williamson
- Born: 25 September 1941
- Died: 28 March 2009 (aged 67)
- Original team: Alvie
- Height: 198 cm (6 ft 6 in)
- Weight: 85 kg (187 lb)
- Position: ruck

Playing career^{1}
| Years | Club | Games (Goals) |
| 1961–1964 | Richmond | 42 (24) |
| 1965 | South Melbourne | 8 (3) |
| Total | | 50 (27) |
- ^{1} Playing statistics correct to the end of 1965.

Gary Williamson (25 September 1941 – 28 March 2009) was an Australian rules footballer who played with Richmond and South Melbourne in the Victorian Football League (VFL).

A ruckman, Williamson spent four seasons at Richmond, after arriving from Alvie. He played 15 games in 1961, the most he would play in a single season. Crossing to South Melbourne in 1965, he would only appear in eight rounds, but it was enough to bring up 50 league games.

For the rest of the 1960s and until his retirement in 1978, Williamson played in a total of 205 games for Wodonga in the Ovens & Murray Football League (OMFL). He joined Wodonga in 1967 and at the end of his debut season was awarded both the club's "Best and Fairest" award as well as the OMFL's Morris Medal. An achilles injury cost him a spot in Wodonga's 1967 premiership side but in 1969, when he won his second club "Best and Fairest", he was a member of their grand final winning team. He also came close to securing another Morris Medal in 1969, finishing second to Jeff Hemphill.

Williamson, who continued to serve Wodonga off the field after his retirement, was named in 2004 as the club's Team of the Century ruckman and two years later was inducted into the OMFL Hall of Fame.

Williamson died in 2009.
