= Steven Hedley =

Australian rules footballer

Steven Wayne Hedley

Personal information
- Full name: Steven Hedley
- Born: 12 September 1959
- Died: 1 January 2007 (aged 47); Queensland, Australia
- Original teams: Wodonga, North Melbourne Reserves
- Height: 183 cm (6 ft 0 in)
- Weight: 86 kg (190 lb)

Playing career^{1}
Years	Club	Games (Goals)
1983	Sydney	1 (1)
- ^{1} Playing statistics correct to the end of 1983.

Steven Hedley (born 12 September 1959) is a former Australian rules footballer who played with Sydney in the Victorian Football League (VFL).

Originally from the Wodonga Football Club, he won the Ovens and Murray Football League Under 18 Best and Fairest Award in 1975.

The following year he won Wodonga’s reserves best and fairest, played a few senior matches and the next year claimed the Ted West Memorial Trophy for the Bulldogs’ senior best and fairest.

He moved to Queensland and starred for Mayne Football Club before coming back to Wodonga for the 1981 season.

Hedley was instrumental in Wodonga’s premiership victory that year, winning a feast of possessions as the Bulldogs turned around a 20-goal loss to Albury in the second semi-final.

Hedley represented the Ovens and Murray Football League in 1982 and ended up playing 85 senior games for Wodonga FC.

Hedley played for South Melbourne Football Club reserves in 1983.

He managed one senior match for the Sydney Swans against North Melbourne Football Club at Arden St and got a goal with his first kick in senior VFL ranks.

The following year he was assistant coach to former Carlton Football Club star Wayne Harmes at Essendon District Football League club, Oak Park Football Club and won its best and fairest.

His career finished with Mangoplah Cookardinia United and he coached the club in 1988 and 1989 to successive premierships, after it had lost six successive grand finals.

Hedley died at the early age of 47 years of age in Queensland.
