= Alex Denney =

Australian rules footballer

Personal information
- Full name: Alexander David Denney
- Born: 24 June 1926; Wycheproof, Victoria
- Died: 26 April 2004 (aged 77)
- Original team: Wycheproof / Caulfield Grammar
- Height: 173 cm (5 ft 8 in)
- Weight: 75 kg (165 lb)

Playing career^{1}
Years	Club	Games (Goals)
1947–1948	Collingwood	35 (2)
- ^{1} Playing statistics correct to the end of 1948.

Alexander David Denney (24 June 1926 – 26 April 2004) was an Australian rules footballer who played for the Collingwood Football Club in the Victorian Football League (VFL).

== Family ==
The son of Powley Denney (1893–1964), and Nellie Violet Denney (1894–1947), née Glover, Alexander David Denney was born in Wycheproof, Victoria on 24 June 1926.

In 1949 he married Betty Lois Coventry, the daughter of Gordon Coventry.

== Education ==
He was educated at Wycheproof State School (No.1757). After winning a major residential scholarship, he attended Caulfield Grammar School, as a boarder, from 1939 to 1942. There, he distinguished himself not only as a student — he was dux of his class in 1939 — but also as a footballer, cricketer, and, especially, an outstanding athlete.

At the school's October 1942 Annual Sports, Denney won the Open 100 yards, 220 yards, and 440 yards races, the 120 yards hurdles, and the long jump. The Australasian's schools' correspondent declared Denney to be "an all-round runner of great promise", in a report to which was appended a photograph of Denney rounding the last bend (in front of the school's tennis courts) of either the 220 or 440 yards races.

Later that same month, when competing for the school in the Associated Grammar Schools of Victoria Combined Sports on 23 October 1942, he broke the 23-year-old record for the Open 100 yards (he won by four yards, in 10 3/10 secs), came second on the Open 220 yards, and won the Open 440 yards.

== Military service ==
He served with the RAAF during the Second World War. During that time, he played football, in Sydney, along with his future brother-in-law, George Coventry, for the RAAF.

== Football ==
=== Wycheproof Football Club (TFL) ===
In 1946, Alex Denney was voted the best and fairest player for the Wycheproof Football Club in the Tyrrell Football League.

=== Collingwood (VFL) ===
Recruited from Wycheproof in 1947, Denney played in his first senior VFL match, against South Melbourne, on 10 May 1947, on the wing, as a replacement for the injured Des Fothergill.

At the end of the 1947, "Clubman", the Weekly Times football correspondent rated ex-Wycheproof Denney the second-best of all of the first-year "former country players" in that year's VFL Competition: the best was the ex-Echuca Melbourne player, Eddie Jackson, and the third-best was the ex-Granya Footscray player, Norm Webb.

After his first four games (two on the wing and two on the half-forward flank), he was transferred to the half-back flank, where he played for almost all of the rest of his career, including the 1948 Semi-Final (against Footscray), and the 1948 Preliminary Final (against Melbourne), his last VFL game, where he was one of Collingwood's best players, although in a losing team.

=== Wycheproof Football Club (TFL/NCFL) ===
In April 1949, Collingwood cleared Denney to back to Wycheproof.

Having won the TFL premiership in 1951, and with ex-Collingwood Hugh Coventry (Denney's wife's cousin) as its captain-coach, the Wycheproof Football Club transferred from the Tyrrell Football League to the North Central Football League (NCFL) in 1952.

Denney was not only the vice-captain of the Wycheproof team that won the 1952 NCFL premiership, defeating the Donald Football Club 15.17 (107) to 4.9 (33), but was also the league's best and fairest player that year.

He was still playing in 1955.
