= Don Calder =

Australian rules footballer

Personal information
- Full name: Donald James Calder
- Born: 29 November 1927
- Died: 25 December 2006 (aged 79)
- Original team: Crib Point
- Height: 185 cm (6 ft 1 in)
- Weight: 90 kg (198 lb)

Playing career^{1}
Years	Club	Games (Goals)
1950–53	Carlton	23 (1)
- ^{1} Playing statistics correct to the end of 1953.

Donald James Calder (29 November 1927 – 25 December 2006) was an Australian rules footballer who played with Carlton in the Victorian Football League (VFL). Calder was captain of Carlton's 1953 Second 18 premiership team.

He joined Wodonga as captain-coach for the 1954 and 1955 Ovens & Murray Football League season.
