= Barry McKenzie (footballer) =

Australian rules footballer (1945–2021)

Personal information
- Full name: Barry McKenzie
- Born: 14 August 1945
- Died: 6 July 2021 (aged 75)
- Original teams: Wodonga, Coleraine
- Height: 193 cm (6 ft 4 in)
- Weight: 99 kg (218 lb)
- Position: Ruck

Playing career^{1}
Years	Club	Games (Goals)
1968–1972	Fitzroy	38 (15)
1973–1976	West Torrens	77
- ^{1} Playing statistics correct to the end of 1976.

Barry McKenzie (14 August 1945 – 6 July 2021) was an Australian rules footballer who played for the Fitzroy Football Club in the Victorian Football League (VFL) and West Torrens in the South Australian Football League (SANFL).
