= Frank Wells (footballer) =

Australian rules footballer

Personal information
- Full name: Frank Wells
- Born: 30 October 1909; Chiltern
- Died: 7 March 1993 (aged 83)
- Original teams: Cohuna, Chiltern
- Height: 180 cm (5 ft 11 in)
- Weight: 76 kg (168 lb)

Playing career^{1}
Years	Club	Games (Goals)
1930, 1934–35	North Melbourne	37 (4)
- ^{1} Playing statistics correct to the end of 1935.

Frank Wells (30 October 1909 – 7 March 1993) was an Australian rules footballer who played with North Melbourne in the Victorian Football League (VFL).

Wells came down to Melbourne from Chiltern and played with Alphington initially, before joining the North Melbourne Football Club.
