= Elijah Hollands =

Australian rules footballer (born 2002)

Personal information
- Full name: Elijah Hollands
- Born: 25 April 2002 (age 24); Adelaide, South Australia
- Original teams: Murray Bushrangers (NAB League); Wodonga (O & M Football League)
- Draft: No. 7, 2020 national draft
- Height: 189 cm (6 ft 2 in)
- Weight: 86 kg (190 lb)
- Position: Midfielder

Playing career^{1}
Years	Club	Games (Goals)
2021–2023	Gold Coast	14 (8)
2024–2026	Carlton	33 (23)
Total		47 (31)
- ^{1} Playing statistics correct to the end of the 2026 season.

Career highlights
- Rising Star Nomination: 2022; VFL premiership player: 2023

Elijah Hollands (born 25 April 2002) is a former professional Australian rules footballer who played for the Gold Coast Suns and the Carlton Football Club in the Australian Football League (AFL).

== Early life ==
Hollands was born in Adelaide, South Australia. His father, Ben, was a professional Australian rules footballer who played 8 AFL games for Richmond in 1999 as well as spending years on Sydney and Port Adelaide's AFL lists. Hollands lived the first nine years of his life in Adelaide before relocating to Wodonga on the Victoria-New South Wales border.

Hollands didn't start playing football until he began with Auskick at the Wodonga Bulldogs going on to play junior football in the Ovens & Murray Football League and made his senior debut for the club at 16 years of age. Leading into his final year of junior football, Hollands was touted as a potential number one draft pick before tearing his ACL and missing the entirety of the 2020 NAB League season. Despite his injury, he was drafted by the Gold Coast Suns with pick 7 in the 2020 AFL draft.

== AFL career ==
=== Gold Coast (2021–2023) ===
Hollands made his AFL debut in QClash 23 against the Brisbane Lions in round 19 of the 2022 AFL season and kicked two goals in his first game, including a goal with his first kick. He received a Rising Star Nomination two weeks later in round 21 against Hawthorn, collecting 23 disposals and kicking two goals.

=== Carlton (2024–2026) ===
Hollands was traded to Carlton following the 2023 AFL season, joining his younger brother Ollie. Before playing a game for Carlton, Hollands was found to be in possession of drugs and given a two-match ban.

During the 2025 AFL season, Hollands took personal leave from the AFL. He later revealed that he had been battling with mental health and issues with alcohol. He was delisted by Carlton following the end of the season with a year remaining on his contract, but given the opportunity to continue training for a list spot through the offseason, and was added back to club's rookie list in the 2026 pre-season supplemental selection period.

In round 6 of the 2026 season, during Carlton's five point loss against Collingwood, Hollands was observed to act erratically, only recording one disposal, before being benched in the final quarter. Concerns were raised for his wellbeing, with Carlton releasing a statement the following day, confirming that he had suffered a mental health episode. On 20 April, Hollands was admitted to hospital, and Carlton was fined $75,000 by the AFL for mismanaging the episode.

Hollands was delisted at the end of the season. Shortly after the announcement, Hollands posted a statement on Instagram, thanking his supporters, family, and the AFL community for their continued support throughout his career.

== Statistics ==
Updated to the end of the 2026 season.

Legend
G	Goals	K	Kicks	D	Disposals	T	Tackles
B	Behinds	H	Handballs	M	Marks

Season	Team	No.	Games	Totals							Averages (per game)							Votes
Season	Team	No.	Games	G	B	K	H	D	M	T	G	B	K	H	D	M	T	Votes
2022	Gold Coast	36	5	5	4	52	33	85	26	11	1.0	0.8	10.4	6.6	17.0	5.2	2.2	0
2023	Gold Coast	36	9	3	2	72	42	114	23	23	0.3	0.2	8.0	4.7	12.7	2.6	2.6	0
2024	Carlton	20	22	17	10	250	141	391	100	58	0.8	0.5	11.4	6.4	17.8	4.5	2.6	3
2025	Carlton	20	5	1	1	51	34	85	19	14	0.2	0.2	10.2	6.8	17.0	3.8	2.8	0
2026	Carlton	20	6	5	1	53	40	93	17	8	0.8	0.2	8.8	6.7	15.5	2.8	1.3	0
Career			47	31	18	478	290	768	185	114	0.7	0.4	10.2	6.2	16.3	3.9	2.4	3
