= Des Healey =

Australian rules footballer

Personal information
- Full name: Desmond Jules Healey
- Born: 5 September 1927; Victoria, Australia
- Died: 18 March 2009 (aged 81); Melbourne, Australia
- Original team: Preston YCW
- Debut: 1948, Collingwood vs. North Melbourne, at Arden Street Oval, North Melbourne

Playing career^{1}
Years	Club	Games (Goals)
1948–1955	Collingwood	149 (37)
- ^{1} Playing statistics correct to the end of 1955.

Career highlights
- Collingwood premiership side 1953; Collingwood best and fairest 1955; Collingwood 2nd best and fairest 1951, 1954; Collingwood 3rd best and fairest 1953; Victorian Team 1949, 1953; All-Australian 1953; Wodonga best and fairest 1957

Desmond Jules Healey (5 September 1927 – 18 March 2009) was an Australian rules footballer, who played in the VFL/AFL with the Collingwood Football Club, and was also a first-grade cricketer with the Collingwood Cricket Club.

He married the daughter of Jack Bisset.

== VFL career ==
After spending 3 years in the reserves team, Healey finally broke into the senior side in 1948. He played every game in 1948 and missed only one in 1949 when he won interstate selection.

The combination of Healey, Thorold Merrett and Bill Twomey, Jr., gave Collingwood a lethal centre line. Healey was a great mark for his size and dazzled the crowd with his evasive ground work and skills. He had great control of the ball and was the master of the pinpoint pass.

Healey was one of the heroes of Collingwood's 1953 Premiership victory and was rated by many as one of the best players on the ground that day. He won All-Australian selection in the same year.

Essendon's great full-forward John Coleman once named Healey as the best wingman he had ever seen. "He is clever, has that wonderful tenacity of all good Collingwood players, and is tireless".

Healey is perhaps best known for his last moments as a League footballer. In the 1955 grand final Healey had a sickening collision with Melbourne's Frank 'Bluey' Adams. They were both stretchered off, with Healey's nose broken in five places and his skull fractured. He never played League football again.

== Post VFL ==
Healey was appointed as captain / coach of the Wodonga Football Club in 1956 and won their best and fairest award in 1957.

Healey also coached Wodonga FC Reserves sides to an Ovens & Murray Football League premierships in 1960.

Healey left Wodonga and accepted a two year coaching job in Junee.

In 1966 he was the coach of Camberwell in the VFA. At the time he was the Sports master at the Jordanville Technical School.

He coached the Collingwood Under 19s to the VFL premiership in 1974.

Healey also played 52 games of senior Melbourne District Cricket with the Collingwood Cricket Club.
