= Laurie Raine =

Australian rules footballer

Personal information
- Full name: Edgar Laurence Raine
- Born: 21 May 1925; Yackandandah, Victoria
- Died: 9 January 2011 (aged 85)
- Original team: Chiltern
- Height: 187 cm (6 ft 2 in)
- Weight: 85 kg (187 lb)

Playing career^{1}
Years	Club	Games (Goals)
1947	Footscray	2 (0)
- ^{1} Playing statistics correct to the end of 1947.

Edgar Laurence "Laurie" Raine (21 May 1925 – 9 January 2011) was an Australian rules footballer who played with Footscray in the Victorian Football League (VFL).

Raine was recruited to Footscray after some impressive performances with Chiltern Football Club in 1945.
