= Norm Webb =

Australian rules footballer

Personal information
- Full name: Norman Arthur Webb
- Born: 18 May 1921
- Died: 16 June 1996 (aged 75)
- Original team: Granya
- Height: 180 cm (5 ft 11 in)
- Weight: 83 kg (183 lb)
- Position: Half Forward / Centre

Playing career^{1}
| Years | Club | Games (Goals) |
| 1947–49 | Footscray | 47 (17) |
- ^{1} Playing statistics correct to the end of 1949.

Norman Arthur "Bunny" Webb (18 May 1921 – 16 June 1996) was a former Australian rules footballer who played with Footscray in the Victorian Football League (VFL).

Webb was originally from the Granya Football Club and played in their 1939 losing grand final side and shared the 1940 Mitta Valley Football Association best and fairest award with W Hodgkin from Mitta Valley.

Webb joined the Army in 1943 and at some stage between 1943 and 1945, Webb played with South Sydney Football Club.

He was recruited to Footscray after playing in Granya's 1946 Tallangatta & District Football League premiership and winning the club best and fairest award too. Webb managed to play 15 consecutive senior games in his first VFL season (1947) after debuting in round five.

At the end of 1947, "Clubman", the Weekly Times football correspondent rated ex-Granya Webb the third-best of all of the first-year "former country players" in that year's VFL Competition: the best was the ex-Echuca Melbourne player, Eddie Jackson, and the second-best was the ex-Wycheproof Collingwood player, Alex Denney.

Webb managed to poll 16 Brownlow Medal votes over three seasons with Footscray between 1947 and 1949.

Webb returned to Granya in 1950 and coached Granya to the 1951 premiership against Tallangatta, as well as playing a few games with Wodonga on permit and polling 7 votes in the 1951 Ovens and Murray Football League best and fairest award, the Morris Medal.

When playing with the Wodonga Football Club in 1952, Webb won the Morris Medal and also won Wodonga's best and fairest award in 1952 too.

Webb was captain-coach of Jindera Football Club in the Hume Football League in 1954.

Webb is the only footballer to have won a Mitta Valley Football League medal (1940), Barton Medal Tallangatta & District Football League (1946 & 1950), Morris Medal Ovens & Murray Football League (1952) and also an Azzi Medal Hume Football League (1955).
