= Michael Garvey (Australian footballer) =

Australian rules footballer

Personal information
- Full name: Michael Garvey
- Nickname: Mick
- Born: 16 October 1965 (age 61)
- Original teams: Corowa Rutherglen, Wodonga
- Height: 187 cm (6 ft 2 in)
- Weight: 84 kg (185 lb)

Playing career^{1}
Years	Club	Games (Goals)
1988–1989	Carlton	3 (0)
- ^{1} Playing statistics correct to the end of 1989.

Michael "Mick" Garvey (born 16 October 1965) is a former Australian rules footballer who played with Carlton in the Victorian Football League (VFL).

Garvey was best on ground in Corowa Rutherglen's senior's 1984 Coreen & District Football League's premiership, before playing three seasons of Ovens & Murray football with Wodonga prior to playing with Carlton.

Garvey was selected by Geelong in the 1990 VFL Pre-season draft but failed to play a senior game with the Cats. Garvey played in Wodonga's 1990 and 1992 Ovens & Murray premierships and enjoyed a fine career their for many more years, playing 161 games.

Garvey later played in the Tallangatta & District Football League and won Barnawartha's best and fairest award in 1996.
