= Lionel Ryan =

Australian rules footballer (1935–2022)

Personal information
- Full name: Lionel Edward Ryan
- Born: 13 May 1935
- Died: 6 September 2022 (aged 87); Melbourne, Australia
- Original team: Woomelang
- Height: 178 cm (5 ft 10 in)
- Weight: 86 kg (190 lb)

Playing career^{1}
Years	Club	Games (Goals)
1954–57	Footscray	32 (12)
- ^{1} Playing statistics correct to the end of 1957.

Lionel Ryan (13 May 1935 – 6 September 2022) was an Australian rules footballer who played with Footscray in the Victorian Football League (VFL).

The plucky redhead missed out on the 1954 VFL Grand Final, being dropped for coach, Charlie Sutton but was named as an emergency for that game after being one of the better players in the semi-final when he suffered a knee injury and was listed as extremely unlucky not to have played in that Grand Final.

Lionel Ryan moved to Yarrawonga Football Club in 1958 and was a member of Yarrawonga's 1959 Ovens and Murray Football League Premiership team and later moved to Wodonga Football Club as Captain / Coach from 1961 to 1963. Ryan was also coach of 1961 Wodonga's Reserves premiership team.

Ryan was the captain of the Ovens & Murray Football League inter league side in 1963, under coach, Bill Stephen.

While playing with Yarrawonga, Lionel was noted for his adroit play and quickness.

Lionel was a P.M.G. Linesman in those days and was well known around Tungamah and District.

Lionel's grandson is Ryan O'Keefe former Sydney Swan's 2005 and 2012 Premiership player and Norm Smith Medal Winner for best on ground performance in the 2012 Swans Premiership win.

Another of Lionel's grandsons is Australian Actor Jake Ryan (Australian actor).
