= Geoff Feehan =

Australian rules footballer (1935–2022)

Personal information
- Full name: Geoff Robert Feehan
- Born: 19 January 1935
- Died: 31 October 2022 (aged 87); Adelaide, South Australia
- Original teams: Wodonga, Elwood
- Height: 188 cm (6 ft 2 in)
- Weight: 83 kg (183 lb)

Playing career^{1}
Years	Club	Games (Goals)
1957–1959	St Kilda	44 (3)
1960–1963	Norwood	56
- ^{1} Playing statistics correct to the end of 1963.

Geoff Robert Feehan (19 January 1935 – 31 October 2022) was an Australian rules footballer who played with St Kilda in the Victorian Football League (VFL) and Norwood in the South Australian National Football League (SANFL).

Originally from Wodonga, where he won the club's 1955 best and fairest award, Feehan also played for Melbourne club Elwood before joining St Kilda. During his career, Feehan was mostly used either as a defender or ruckman. He played all 18 games for St Kilda in the 1957 VFL season and added another 26 over the next two years.

He joined Norwood in 1960, who also signed Alan Killigrew, his coach from St Kilda. In four seasons at Norwood, Feehan played in two SANFL grand finals. He was one of his club's best performers in the 1960 Grand Final, which they lost by five points to North Adelaide and again suffered disappointment in 1961 when West Adelaide were too strong.
