= Tallangatta & District Football League =

Australian football competition

- Current season, competition or edition: 2025
- Sport: Australian rules football
- Founded: 1945; 81 years ago
- CEO: David Nichols
- President: Jarrod Stephenson
- No. of teams: 12
- Country: Australia
- Venues: Finals at: Sandy Creek Recreation Reserve, Reserve Rd, Sandy Creek, Victoria.
- Confederation: AFL Victoria Country
- Most titles: (22): Mitta United
- Sponsor: Dunn's Twin City Cranes
- Level on pyramid: 1
- Website: tdfl.com.au

The Tallangatta and District Football League (TDFL) is an Australian rules football competition in north-eastern Victoria and the southern border area of the Riverina region of New South Wales. The clubs compete across four competitions, two of which are age restricted (under-17s and under-14s).

Since 1980, the Tallangatta & District Netball Association (TDNA) has run in conjunction with TDFL. The clubs compete across six competitions, three of which are age restricted (18 & Under, 15 & Under, and 13 & Under).

Today all of the 12 clubs across both the TDFL & TDNA are joint football–netball clubs, with the overall best club across all football and netball competitions for the season awarded the Club Championship.

== History ==
=== Origins ===
The very first Tallangatta Football Association was formed in 1907, with Granya taking out the premiership then in 1908, Sandy Creek defeated Granya in the grand final by two points.

There was a Tallangatta & District Football Association in 1922, with Tallangatta defeating Bethanga in the grand final and in 1923, Kiewa won the premiership by defeating Granya.

In 1929, the Tallangatta & District Football Association was reformed with Granya winning premierships in 1929 and 1933 and were runners up to Mitta Mitta in 1930. In 1931, Mitta Mitta gained premiership honours by defeating Tallangatta. In 1932, it appears that there was no T&DFA, with most local teams playing in the Yackandandah & District Football League.

The Dederang & District Football Association ran from 1932 to 1939, which included many of the clubs that had previously played in the above football competitions.

In 1934 there was a Tallangatta & District Junior Football Association, which was won by Sandy Creek FC in 1934.

The Dederang & District Football Association ran from 1932 to 1939, comprising the following teams – Eskdale, Happy Valley, Kergunyah, Kiewa, Mudgegonga, Tallangatta, Tawonga, Yackandandah.

Then in 1940, the Kiewa & Mitta Valleys Football Association was established from the following teams – Bethanga, Granya, Kiewa, Mitta Valley, Sandy Creek and Tallangatta, but the Association then went into recess in 1941, due to World War II.

In 1944, the Mitta Valley Patriotic Football Association was established from the following clubs – Eskdale, Fernvale, Mitta Mitta, Sandy Creek and Tallangatta and the Fernvale Football Club were the 1944 Premiers, defeating Sandy Creek Football Club by 51 points at Eskdale.

The Mitta Valley Patriotic Football Association was then superseded by the current Tallangatta & District Football League in 1945.

=== Founding ===
The Tallangatta and District Football League was officially formed in 1945 comprising six teams and kicked off on 21 April 1945. The final ladder positions for the 1945 season were as follows, with the top four clubs playing finals:

- 1st: Tallangatta Football Club
- 2nd: Mitta Football Club
- 3rd: Fernvale Football Club
- 4th: Granya Football Club
- 5th: Sandy Creek Football Club
- 6th: Bethanga Football Club

The 1945 Grand Final took place on Saturday 21 July, and saw the Tallangatta Magpies (4.7.31) defeat Fernvale (2.9.21) at the Sandy Creek Recreation Reserve (Sandy Creek, Victoria) to become the League's first official Premiers.

In 1952, Eskdale and Mitta merged to form Mitta United Football Club.

=== New millennium, new clubs ===
Following the exodus by two clubs (Culcairn Lions in 1992 and Holbrook Brookers in 1999) to the Hume Football League, the league's number of clubs remained at eight to start the new millennium. At this time of the seven Indigo Shire based clubs only three competed in the Tallangatta & District Football League (Barnawartha, Kiewa-Sandy Creek, and Yackandandah ). While of the four remaining clubs three competed in the Ovens & King Football League (Beechworth, Chiltern, and Rutherglen-Corowa) and one in the Coreen & District Football League (Wahgunyah).

Chiltern joined the league from the 2003 season, they were the first new club to join the league since the Thurgoona Bulldogs since 1988. The Swans had spent the past 49 years with the Ovens & King Football League, during this time they had won a total of 10 senior football premierships (1957, 1958, 1968, 1971, 1972, 1982, 1983, 1994, 1996, 1998).

In 2003 both the Beechworth Bombers & Rutherglen Cats applied for an application to join the Tallangatta & District Football League but were refused by their current league's board, Ovens & King Football League. Seeking a new home the clubs took their appeal to the Victoria Country Football League and won the right to join the Tallangatta & District Football League from the 2004 season. While Rutherglen were unable to achieve the ultimate success in the Ovens and King Football League they were allowed to keep the Cats as their moniker along with the "Geelong-Style" Navy & White home jumper. Beechworth claimed the O&K flag on 14 occasions (1912, 1913, 1914, 1937, 1938, 1939, 1950, 1951, 1956, 1961, 1974, 1979, 2000, 2001) but were left with no choice then to find a new moniker and jumper, because the Dederang-Mt. Beauty Football Club already used the Bombers as their moniker along with the "Essendon-Style" Red & Black home jumper. Prior to the start of the 2004 season the club unveiled their new identity, they adopted the Bushrangers as their moniker along with the "Port Melbourne-Style" Blue & Red home jumper.

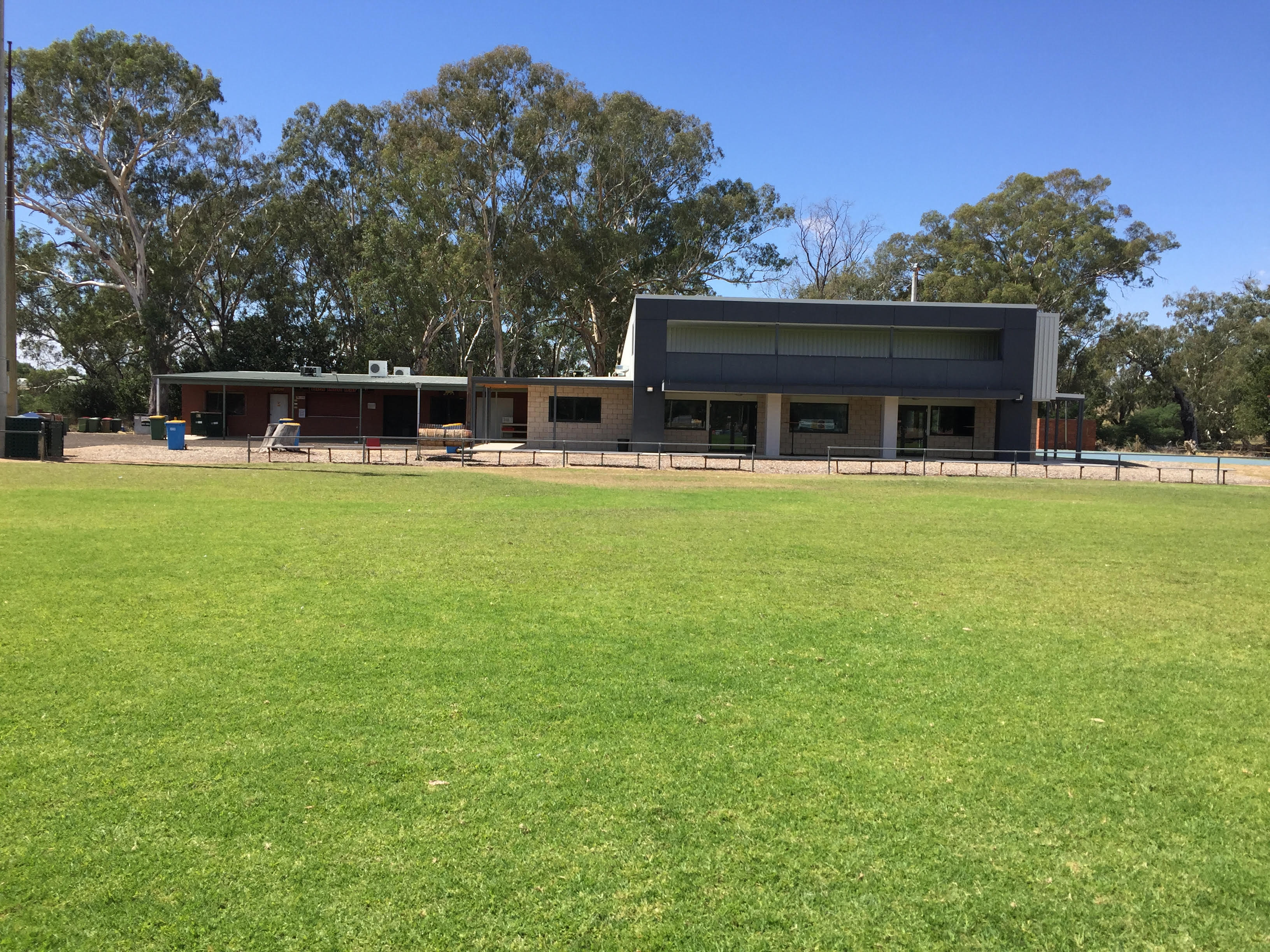
Wahgunyah FNC Clubrooms

The Wahgunyah Tigers were granted permission to join from the 2008 season after the Coreen & District Football League went into recess at the conclusion of the 2007 season, having won 7 senior football premierships over their 51 years with the league (1948, 1949, 1968, 1997, 1998, 2002, 2004). Because the Barnawartha Football Club already used the Tigers as their moniker along with the "Richmond-Style" Yellow & Black home jumper. Wahgunyah were left with no choice but to find a new moniker and jumper. Prior to the start of the 2008 season the club unveiled their new identity, they adopted the Lions as their moniker along with the "Brisbane Lions-Style" Maroon, Blue & Gold home jumper.

== Clubs ==
=== Locations ===
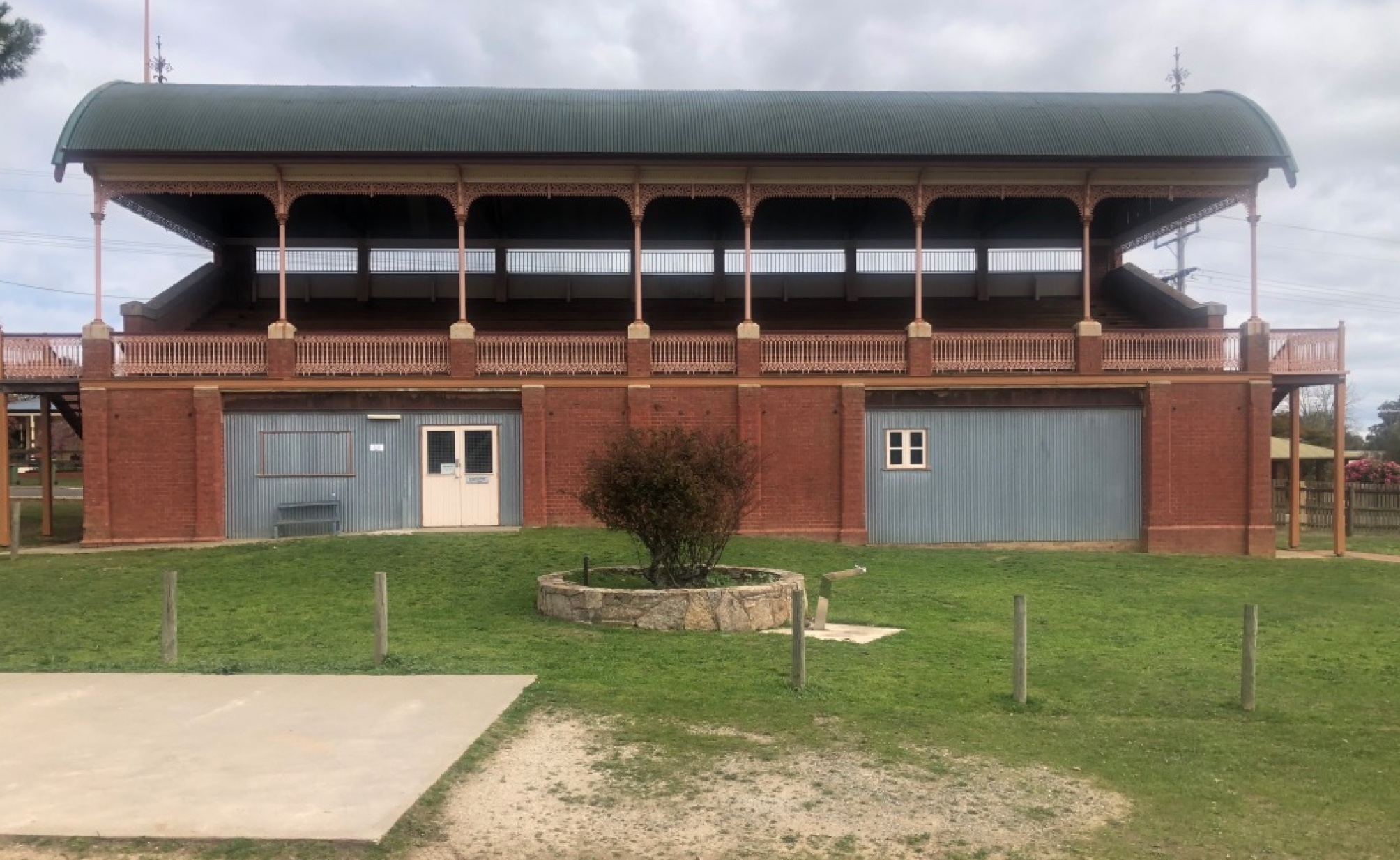
Baamutha Park Grandstand, Beechworth

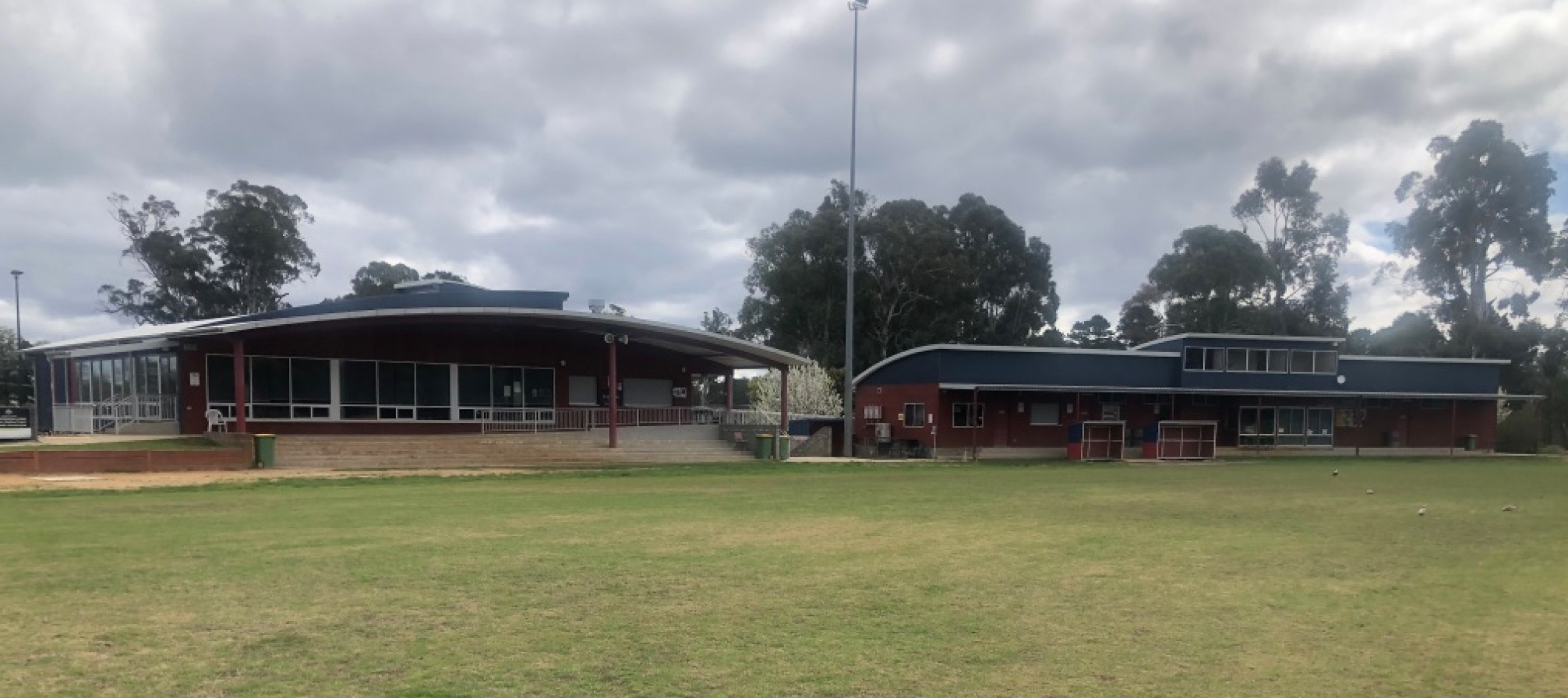
Beechworth Football Netball Clubrooms

Locations of the 2025 TDFL clubs. Coloured pogs represent teams with multiple home grounds: orange for Dederang-Mt. Beauty and yellow for Mitta United.

Club	Colours	Moniker	Home Ground	Former League	Est.	Joined	TDFL Senior Premierships	
Club	Colours	Moniker	Home Ground	Former League	Est.	Joined	Total	Years
Barnawartha		Tigers	Barnawartha Recreation Reserve, Barnawartha	CDFL	1911	1958–	3	2002, 2013, 2026
Beechworth		Bushrangers	Baarmutha Park, Beechworth	O&KFL	1861	2004–	1	2010
Chiltern		Swans	Chiltern Recreation and Sports Reserve, Chiltern	O&KFL	1860s	2003–	2	2022, 2023
Dederang-Mt. Beauty		Bombers	Dederang Recreation Reserve, Dederang and Mount Beauty Recreation Reserve, Mount Beauty	–	1976	1976–	3	1999, 2001, 2003
Kiewa-Sandy Creek		Hawks	Coulston Park, Tangambalanga	–	1969	1969–	14	1969, 1970, 1972, 1976, 1977, 1981, 1983, 1984, 1995, 2008, 2011, 2014, 2018, 2025
Mitta United		Mountain Men	Eskdale Recreation Reserve, Eskdale and Magorra Park, Mitta Mitta	–	1945	1945; 1952–	22	1952, 1953, 1959, 1960, 1961, 1963, 1967, 1968, 1973, 1975, 1978, 1982, 1986, 1988, 1992, 1993, 1996, 2004, 2005, 2006, 2007, 2012
Rutherglen		Cats	Barkly Park, Rutherglen	O&KFL	1978	2004–	0	–
Tallangatta (Note: "Tallangatta Football Club" were known as the "Tallangatta Valley Football Club" from establishment in 1978 until being renamed in 2008.)		Hoppers	Rowen Park, Tallangatta	–	1978	1978–	8	1979, 1980, 1989, 1994, 1997, 1998, 2009, 2015
Thurgoona		Bulldogs	Thurgoona Oval, Thurgoona	–	1988	1988–	3	2016, 2017, 2019
Wahgunyah		Lions	Wahgunyah Recreation Reserve, Wahgunyah	CDFNL	1908	2008–	0	–
Wodonga Saints (Note: "Wodonga Saints Football Club" were known as the "Bethanga Football Club" from establishment in 1907 until relocation in 2001.)		Saints	Martin Park, Wodonga	–	1907	1945–1947; 1949–1950; 1952–1955; 1957; 1976–	0	–
Yackandandah (Note: "Yackandandah Football Club" only competed in TDFL Reserves Grades from the 1969 season until the 1971 season.)		Roos	Butson Park, Yackandandah	CDFL	1884	1957–1968; 1972–	3	1964, 2000, 2024

=== Former clubs ===
Club	Colours	Moniker	Home Ground	Former League	Est.	Joined	TDFL Senior Premierships		Fate
Club	Colours	Moniker	Home Ground	Former League	Est.	Joined	Total	Years	Fate
Bandiana	Dark with light BFC monogram		Bandiana Recreation Reserve, Bandiana	C&DFL	1947	1952; 1958–1963; 1965–1972	0	–	Folded in 1973
Bogong		Bombers	Bogong Recreation Reserve, Bogong	O&KFL	1946	1960–1963	0	–	Merged with Tawonga to form Bogong-Tawonga 1964
Bullioh Valley	(1947–63)(1964–77)	Bulldogs	Wyeeboo/Bullioh Recreation Reserve, Tallangatta Valley	–	1947	1947–1958; 1960–1977	1	1950	Merged with Tallangatta to form Tallangatta Valley in 1977
Culcairn		Lions	Culcairn Recreation Reserve, Culcairn	FFL	1914	1981–1991	1	1990	Moved to Hume FNL in 1992
Dederang			Dederang Recreation Reserve, Dederang	YDFL	1906	1955–1975	2	1958, 1962	Merged with Mt Beauty to form Dederang-Mt Beauty in 1975
Eskdale (Note: "Eskdale Football Club" were known as the "Mitta Valley Football Club" from reforming in 1947 until being renamed in 1951.)	(1924) (1927)	Purples	Eskdale Recreation Reserve, Eskdale	KMVFA	1894	1947–1951	0	–	Merged with Mitta Town to form Mitta United in 1952
Fernvale			Fernvale Recreation Reserve, Tallangatta South	KMVFA	1913	1945–1956	1	1948	Folded in 1957
Granya			Bungil Park, Granya	KMVFA	1886	1945–1953	3	1946, 1947, 1951	Entered recess 1954. Merged with Bethanga to form Murray United in 1958
Holbrook		Brookers	Holbrook Sporting Complex, Holbrook	FFL	1922	1981–1998	2	1985, 1991.	Moved to Hume FNL in 1999
Kergunyah		Demons	Kergunyah Recreation Reserve, Kergunyah	Y&DFL	1923	1953–1975	3	1955, 1956, 1957	Folded in 1975
Kiewa		Rovers	Kiewa Memorial Park, Kiewa	Y&DFL	1895	1952–1968	0	–	Merged with Sandy Creek to form Kiewa-Sandy Creek in 1969
Lavington (Note: "Lavington Football Club" are rumoured to have also fielded three additional senior sides under the names of "Lavington Dragons FC", "Lavington Lions FC", and "Lavington Rovers FC". However neither of the "Lavington Dragons FC" or the "Lavington Lions FC"additional sides are mentioned on the "Tallangatta & Districts Football League" or the "Lavington Football Club" websites.)		Saints	Urana Road Oval, Lavington	CDFL	1924	1958–1976	3	1965, 1966, 1971	Moved to Ovens & Murray FL in 1979
Lavington Rangers		Rangers	Lavington Sports Ground, Hamilton Valley	–	1973	1973–1978	0	–	Amalgamated with Lavington in 1979
Mitta Town (Note: "Mitta Town Football Club" were known as the "Mitta Mitta Football Club" from establishment in 1885 until merging in 1945.)		Snowys	Magorra Park, Mitta Mitta	CDFL	1885	1947–1951	0	–	Merged with Eskdale to form Mitta United in 1952
Mt. Beauty (Note: "Mt. Beauty Football Club" were known as the "Bogong-Tawonga Football Club" from establishment in 1964 until being renamed in 1975.)		Bombers	Mount Beauty Recreation Reserve, Mount Beauty	–	1964	1964–1975	0	–	Bogong Tawonga changed their name to Mt. Beauty in 1975, then merged with Dederang to form Dederang-Mt Beauty in 1976
Murray United (Note: "Murray United Football Club" were known as the "Bethanga-Granya Football Club" from establishment in 1958 until being renamed in 1959.)		Bombers	Bungil Park, Granya	–	1958	1958–1959	0	–	Folded in 1960
RAEME (Note: "RAEME Football Club" were a football club solely made up of service men from the Military Area of Bandiana, their full name was the "Royal Australian Electrical and Mechanical Engineers Football Club".)			Bandiana Recreation Reserve, Bandiana	–	1953	1953–1954	0	–	Withdrew from the T&DFL after Rd.9, 1954
Sandy Creek			Sandy Creek Recreation Reserve, Sandy Creek	Y&DFL	1894	1945–1946; 1950–1958; 1960–1968	0	–	Merged with Kiewa to form Kiewa-Sandy Creek in 1969
South Albury			Albury Sports Ground (trained at Noreuil Park)	C&DFL	1932	1977–1981	0	–	Merged with Albury 2nds in 1953. Reformed in 1977, folded in 1982.
Tallangatta		Magpies	Rowen Park, Tallangatta	KMVFA	1883	1945–1977	4	1945, 1949, 1954, 1974	Merged with Bullioh Valley to form Tallangatta Valley in 1978
Tawonga			Tawonga Recreation Reserve, Tawonga	Y&DFL	1927	1954–1957	0	–	Entered recess in 1958, merged with Bogong to form Bogong-Tawonga in 1964
Wodonga Demons		Demons	Birallee Park, West Wodonga	–	1975	1976–1988	1	1987	Moved to Ovens & Murray FL in 1989

== League honours and records ==
Club / Overall premierships	F	"1"	"2"	"3"	"4"	N	"A"	"B"	"C"	"D"	"E"	"F"	T
Currently there are some premiers which are undocumented and as such unknown. (See bottom of table for unknown Premiership years.)
Bandiana	00	00	00	N/A	N/A	00	N/A	N/A	N/A	N/A	N/A	N/A	00
Barnawartha	11	02	03	05	01	22	04	03	03	03	05	04	33
Beechworth	04	01	00	01	02	00	00	00	00	00	00	00	04
Bogong	00	00	N/A	N/A	N/A	00	N/A	N/A	N/A	N/A	N/A	N/A	00
Bullioh Valley	01	01	00	00	N/A	00	N/A	N/A	N/A	N/A	N/A	N/A	01
Chiltern	00	00	00	00	00	08	00	05	00	01	01	01	08
Culcairn	04	01	01	01	01	03	02	01	N/A	N/A	N/A	N/A	07
Dederang	02	02	00	00	N/A	00	N/A	N/A	N/A	N/A	N/A	N/A	02
Dederang-Mt. Beauty	09	03	02	00	04	08	05	02	00	01	00	00	17
Eskdale	00	00	N/A	N/A	N/A	00	N/A	N/A	N/A	N/A	N/A	N/A	00
Fernvale	01	01	N/A	N/A	N/A	00	N/A	N/A	N/A	N/A	N/A	N/A	01
Granya	03	03	N/A	N/A	N/A	00	N/A	N/A	N/A	N/A	N/A	N/A	03
Holbrook	03	02	01	00	00	08	01	05	N/A	01	01	00	11
Kergunyah	03	03	00	00	N/A	00	N/A	N/A	N/A	N/A	N/A	N/A	03
Kiewa	00	00	00	N/A	N/A	00	N/A	N/A	N/A	N/A	N/A	N/A	00
Kiewa-Sandy Creek	28	12	07	06	03	24	06	05	01	03	02	07	52
Lavington	08	03	04	01	N/A	00	N/A	N/A	N/A	N/A	N/A	N/A	08
Lavington Rangers	00	00	00	00	N/A	00	N/A	N/A	N/A	N/A	N/A	N/A	00
Mitta Town	00	00	N/A	N/A	N/A	00	N/A	N/A	N/A	N/A	N/A	N/A	00
Mitta United	36	22	09	01	04	06	01	01	00	02	02	00	42
Mt. Beauty	00	00	00	00	N/A	00	N/A	N/A	N/A	N/A	N/A	N/A	00
Murray United	00	00	N/A	N/A	N/A	00	N/A	N/A	N/A	N/A	N/A	N/A	00
RAEME	00	00	N/A	N/A	N/A	00	N/A	N/A	N/A	N/A	N/A	N/A	00
Rutherglen	01	00	00	00	01	02	00	00	00	01	00	01	03
Sandy Creek	00	00	00	N/A	N/A	00	N/A	N/A	N/A	N/A	N/A	N/A	00
South Albury	00	00	00	00	00	00	00	00	N/A	N/A	N/A	N/A	00
Tallangatta	05	04	01	00	N/A	00	N/A	N/A	N/A	N/A	N/A	N/A	05
Tallangatta (Tallangatta Valley: 1978–2009)	24	08	01	10	05	14	02	04	00	02	03	03	38
Tawonga	00	00	N/A	N/A	N/A	00	N/A	N/A	N/A	N/A	N/A	N/A	00
Thurgoona	13	02	06	02	03	23	06	05	01	06	03	02	36
Wahgunyah	06	00	01	01	04	02	01	01	00	00	00	00	08
Wodonga Demons	05	01	01	02	01	01	00	01	N/A	N/A	N/A	N/A	06
Wodonga Saints	01	00	00	01	00	20	04	01	00	03	08	05	21
Yackandandah	11	02	05	03	01	17	06	04	00	03	01	03	28
"N/A"' = Not applicable as this competition was established after the club left the league.
Unknown TDFL Premiers: 1974–2001	31	N/A	10	12	09	00	N/A	N/A	N/A	N/A	N/A	N/A	31

== Grand final results ==
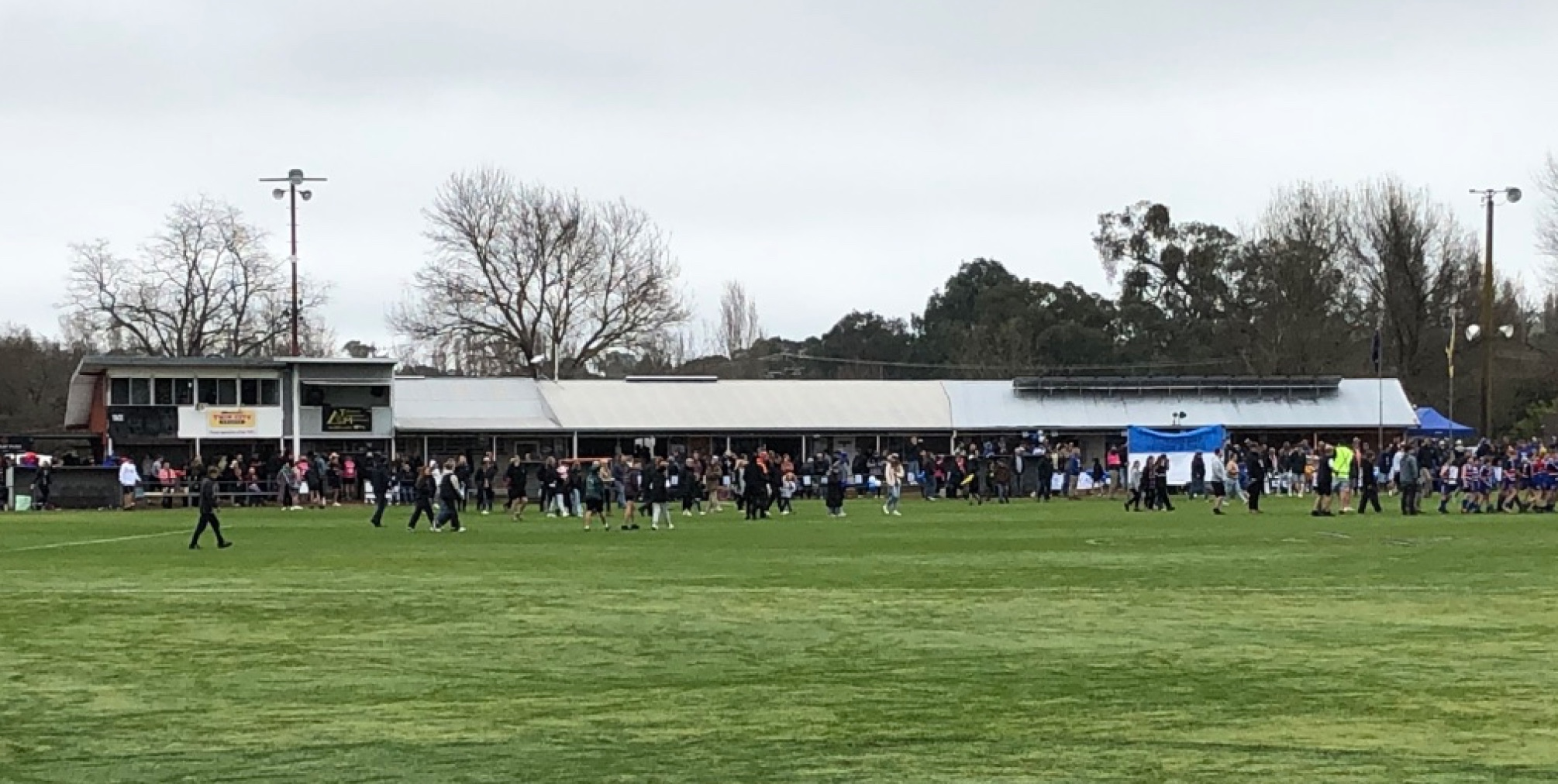
Sandy Creek Recreation Reserve, Victoria

=== Seniors ===
Currently two of the early Tallangatta & DFL grand finals venues are undocumented and as such unknown. The unknown T&DFNL grand final venues are in the seasons of 1948 and 1955. The grand finals have been played continuously at the Sandy Creek Recreation Reserve since 1978.

The best on ground award in the Tallangatta & DFL senior football grand final receives the Wayne Bartel Memorial / AFL Victorian Country Medal. Wayne Bartel died in June 1988, aged 39. Unfortunately, there is no current complete list of previous winners of this award and unsure when this award was initially presented.

Year	Premiers	Score	Runners up	Score	Venue	Best on Ground	Gate/Comments
	Kiewa & Mitta Valleys FA						
1940	Mitta Valley	14.7 – 91	Tallangatta	6.7 – 43	Tallangatta		
1941–43							In recess > World War II
	Mitta Valley Patriotic FA						
1944	Fernvale	10.19 – 79	Sandy Creek	4.4 – 28	Eskdale		£58/6
	Tallangatta & DFL						
1945	Tallangatta	4.7 – 31	Fernvale	2.0 – 12	Sandy Creek		£58/6
1946	Granya	12.8 – 80	Mitta-Eskdale	8.7 – 55	Sandy Creek		
1947	Granya	8.8 – 56	Tallangatta	7.10 – 52	Tallangatta Valley		
1948	Fernvale	20.10 – 130	Tallangatta	12.4 – 76	?		
1949	Tallangatta	8.8 – 56	Bullioh Valley	7.6 – 48	Tallangatta		
1950	Bullioh Valley	9.9 – 63	Granya	9.8 – 62	Sandy Creek		
1951	Granya	12.20 – 92	Tallangatta	9.16 – 70	Sandy Creek		
1952	Mitta United	6.15 – 51	Bullioh Valley	2.7 – 21	Sandy Creek		
1953	Mitta United	6.9 – 45	Granya	3.7 – 25	Sandy Creek		
1954	Tallangatta	13.13 – 91	Kiewa	8.9 – 57	Sandy Creek		£109
1955	Kergunyah	8.6 – 54	Mitta United	7.7 – 49	?		
1956	Kergunyah	18.13 – 121	Kiewa	5.11 – 41	Sandy Creek		
1957	Kergunyah	11.14 – 80	Mitta United	5.8 – 38	Sandy Creek		
1958	Dederang	11.5 – 71	Mitta United	10.7 – 67	Sandy Creek		
1959	Mitta United	9.14 – 68	Kiewa	6.11 – 47	Lavington		
1960	Mitta United	9.15 – 69	Lavington	6.7 – 43	Tallangatta		
1961	Mitta United	10.10 – 70	Lavington	3.15 – 33	Tallangatta		
1962	Dederang	5.7 – 37	Bogong	4.13 – 37	Tallangatta		Drawn Grand Final
	Dederang	10.13 – 73	Bogong	8.10 – 58	Tallangatta		Grand Final Replay
1963	Mitta United	6.14 – 50	Bogong	7.7 – 49	Tallangatta		
1964	Yackandandah	9.6 – 60	Lavington	8.8 – 56	Sandy Creek		
1965	Lavington	8.6 – 54	Bogong-Tawonga	6.14 – 50	Sandy Creek		
1966	Lavington	9.13 67	Bogong-Tawonga	9.6 – 60	Tallangatta		
1967	Mitta United	11.9 – 75	Bogong-Tawonga	9.6 – 60	Tallangatta		
1968	Mitta United	11.9 – 75	Dederang	11.8 – 74	Sandy Creek		
1969	Kiewa Sandy Creek	9.14 – 68	Lavington	9.9 – 63	Tallangatta		
1970	Kiewa Sandy Creek	13.7 – 85	Lavington	11.12 – 78	Barnawartha		
1971	Lavington	14.15 99	Kiewa-Sandy Creek	11.12 – 78	Sandy Creek		
1972	Kiewa-Sandy Creek	17.13 – 115	Bullioh Valley	11.8 – 74	Sandy Creek		$760
1973	Mitta United	17.10 (112)	Lavington Saints	17.9 – 111	Sandy Creek		
1974	Tallangatta	10.9 (69)	Lavington Dragons	9.10 – 64	Sandy Creek		
1975	Mitta United	14.15 – 99	Tallangatta	13.20 – 98	Sandy Creek		
1976	Kiewa-Sandy Creek	20.16 – 136	Bullioh Valley	12.9 – 81	Sandy Creek		
1977	Kiewa-Sandy Creek	13.22 – 100	Yackandandah	11.14 – 80	Martin Park, Wodonga		
1978	Mitta United	10.10 – 70	Tallangatta Valley	7.13 – 55	Sandy Creek		$2,900
1979	Tallangatta Valley	12.15 – 87	Kiewa-Sandy Creek	10.7 – 67	Sandy Creek		
1980	Tallangatta Valley	20.10 – 130	Wodonga Demons	13.11 – 89	Sandy Creek		
1981	Kiewa Sandy Creek	12.9 – 81	Tallangatta Valley	8.12 – 60	Sandy Creek		$3,200
1982	Mitta United	20.20 – 140	Culcairn	11.4 – 70	Sandy Creek		
1983	Kiewa Sandy Creek	12.10 – 82	Holbrook	11.16 – 82	Sandy Creek		Drawn G Final
	Kiewa Sandy Creek	15.14 – 104	Holbrook	8.9 – 57	Sandy Creek		G Final Replay
1984	Kiewa Sandy Creek	20.18 – 138	Culcairn	15.16 – 106	Sandy Creek		
1985	Holbrook	22.17 – 149	Wodonga Demons	13.6 – 84	Sandy Creek	Robbie Mackinlay	$8995
1986	Mitta United	17.14 – 116	Kiewa-Sandy Creek	7.11 – 53	Sandy Creek		
1987	Wodonga Demons	15.13 – 103	Mitta United	14.13 – 97	Sandy Creek		
1988	Mitta United	14.16 – 100	Holbrook	10.11 – 71	Sandy Creek		
1989	Tallangatta Valley	13.13 – 91	Holbrook	8.12 – 60	Sandy Creek		
1990	Culcairn	12.14 – 86	Tallangatta Valley	8.15 – 63	Sandy Creek		Crowd: 4,500
1991	Holbrook	16.12 – 108	Bethanga	14.11 – 95	Sandy Creek		Crowd: 4,500
1992	Mitta United	11.6 – 72	Barnawartha	7.11 – 53	Sandy Creek		
1993	Mitta United	14.8 – 92	Tallangatta Valley	14.2 – 86	Sandy Creek		
1994	Tallangatta Valley	19.17 – 131	Kiewa-Sandy Creek	10.18 – 78	Sandy Creek		
1995	Kiewa Sandy Creek	17.11 – 113	Mitta United	8.8 – 56	Sandy Creek		
1996	Mitta United	13.7 – 85	Tallangatta Valley	12.11 – 83	Sandy Creek		
1997	Tallangatta Valley	15.10 – 100	Mitta United	7.15 – 57	Sandy Creek		
1998	Tallangatta Valley	10.16 – 76	Dederang-Mt. Beauty	4.4 – 28	Sandy Creek		
1999	Dederang Mt Beauty	15.13 – 103	Kiewa-Sandy Creek	13.9 – 87	Sandy Creek		
2000	Yackandandah	17.19 – 121	Barnawartha	17.9 – 111	Sandy Creek		
2001	Dederang Mt Beauty	17.9 – 111	Barnawartha	12.13 – 85	Sandy Creek	Glenn Page	$14,500
2002	Barnawartha	21.17 – 143	Tallangatta Valley	9.9 – 63	Sandy Creek		
2003	Dederang Mt Beauty	19.10 – 124	Mitta United	9.10 – 64	Sandy Creek		
2004	Mitta United	5.18 – 48	Wodonga Saints	2.8 – 20	Sandy Creek		
2005	Mitta United	11.15 – 81	Dederang-Mt. Beauty	6.8 – 44	Sandy Creek		
2006	Mitta United	9.5 – 59	Chiltern	7.8 – 50	Sandy Creek		
2007	Mitta United	8.7 – 55	Kiewa-Sandy Creek	7.12 – 54	Sandy Creek		
2008	Kiewa Sandy Creek	14.28 – 112	Dederang-Mt. Beauty	11.12 – 78	Sandy Creek		
2009	Tallangatta	13.10 – 88	Beechworth	8.15 – 63	Sandy Creek		
2010	Beechworth	18.9 – 117	Yackandandah	12.5 – 77	Sandy Creek		
2011	Kiewa Sandy Creek	15.6 – 96	Thurgoona	11.6 – 72	Sandy Creek		
2012	Mitta United	18.11 – 119	Thurgoona	8.12 – 60	Sandy Creek		
2013	Barnwartha	13.14 – 92	Mitta United	11.6 – 72	Sandy Creek		
2014	Kiewa Sandy Creek	16.12 – 108	Mitta United	14.7 – 91	Sandy Creek		
2015	Tallangatta	10.8 – 68	Kiewa Sandy Creek	8.20 – 68	Sandy Creek		Drawn G Final
	Tallangatta	11.10 – 76	Kiewa Sandy Creek	9.21 – 75	Sandy Creek	Mikal Bloom (T)	Extra Time
2016	Thurgoona	18.20 – 128	Mitta United	10.8 – 68	Sandy Creek	Aydan Brown (T)	
2017	Thurgoona	22.10 – 142	Kiewa Sandy Creek	8.9 – 57	Sandy Creek		
2018	Kiewa Sandy Creek	14.16 – 100	Thurgoona	9.8 – 62	Sandy Creek	Jack Di Mizio (K)	$39,150
2019	Thurgoona	21.7 – 133	Barnawartha	9.8 – 62	Sandy Creek		
2020							In recess: COVID-19
2021	1st: Yackandandah	10 wins, 1 loss	2nd: Chiltern	9 wins, 2 losses		COVID-19	No finals series
2022	Chiltern	4.9 – 33	Kiewa Sandy Creek	2.5 – 17	Sandy Creek	Scott Meyer (C)	
2023	Chiltern	10.9 – 69	Kiewa Sandy Creek	9.12 – 66	Sandy Creek	Scott Meyer (C)	
2024	Yackandandah	10.11 – 71	Chiltern	7.5 – 47	Sandy Creek	Zac Leitch (Y)	
2025	Kiewa Sandy Creek	14.17 – 101	Barnawartha	5.5 – 35	Sandy Creek	Connor Newnham (KSC)	
2026	Barnawartha	12.14 – 86	Kiewa Sandy Creek	11.6 – 72	Sandy Creek	Thomas Johnson (B)	
2027							
Year	Premiers	Score	Runners up	Score	Venue	Best on Ground	Gate/Comments

Football – Seniors: 1945 to present

Currently two of the early Tallangatta & DFNL grand finals venues are undocumented and as such unknown. The unknown T&DFNL grand final venues are in the seasons of 1948 and 1955.

The grand finals have been played continuously at the Sandy Creek Recreation Reserve since 1978.

- 1945: Tallangatta 4.7 (31) def. Fernvale 2.9 (21) at Sandy Creek.
- 1946: Granya 12.8 (80) def.Mitta-Eskdale 8.7 (55) at Sandy Creek.
- 1947: Granya 8.8 (56) def. Tallangatta 7.10 (52) at Tallangatta Valley.
- 1948: Fernvale 19.10 (124) def.Tallangatta 12.4 (76)
- 1949: Tallangatta 8.8 (56) def. Bullioh Valley 7.6 (48) at Tallangatta
- 1950: Bullioh Valley 9.9 (63) def. Granya 9.8 (62) at Sandy Creek.
- 1951: Granya 12.20 (92) def. Tallangatta 9.16 (70)at Sandy Creek.
- 1952: Mitta United 6.15 (51) def. Bullioh Valley 2.7 (19) at Sandy Creek
- 1953: Mitta United 6.9 (45) def. Granya 3.7 (25) at Sandy Creek
- 1954: Tallangatta 13.13 (91) def. Kiewa 8.9 (57) at Sandy Creek
- 1955: Kergunyah 8.6 (54) def. Mitta United 7.7 (49)
- 1956: Kergunyah 18.13 (121) def. Kiewa 5.11 (41) at Sandy Creek.
- 1957: Kergunyah 11.14 (80) def. Mitta United 5.8 (38) at Sandy Creek.
- 1958: Dederang 11.5 (71) def. Mitta United 10.7 (67) at Sandy Creek.
- 1959: Mitta United 9.14 (68) def. Kiewa 6.11 (47) at Lavington.
- 1960: Mitta United 9.15 (69) def. Lavington 6.7 (43) at Tallangatta.
- 1961: Mitta United 10.10 (70) def. Lavington 3.15 (33) at Tallangatta.
- 1962: Dederang 5.7 (37) drew with Bogong 4.13 (37) at Tallangatta.
  - (Replay) Dederang 10.13 (73) def. Bogong 8.10 (58) at Tallangatta.
- 1963: Mitta United 6.14 (50) def. Bogong 7.7 (49) at Sandy Creek.
- 1964: Yackandandah 9.6 (60) def. Lavington 8.8 (56) at Sandy Creek.
- 1965: Lavington 8.6 (54) def. Bogong-Tawonga 6.14 (50) at Sandy Creek.
- 1966: Lavington 9.13 (67) def. Bogong-Tawonga 9.6 (60) at Tallangatta.
- 1967: Mitta United 11.9 (75) def. Bogong-Tawonga 9.6 (60) at Tallangatta.
- 1968: Mitta United 11.9 (75) def. Dederang 11.8 (74) at Sandy Creek.
- 1969: Kiewa-Sandy Creek 9.14 (68) def. Lavington 9.9 (63) at Tallangatta.
- 1970: Kiewa-Sandy Creek 13.7 (85) def. Lavington 11.12 (78) at Barnawartha.
- 1971: Lavington 14.15 (99) def. Kiewa-Sandy Creek 11.12 (78) at Sandy Creek.
- 1972: Kiewa-Sandy Creek 17.13 (115) def. Bullioh Valley 11.8 (74) at Sandy Creek.
- 1973: Mitta United 17.10 (112) def. Lavington Saints 17.9 (111) at Sandy Creek.
- 1974: Tallangatta 10.9 (69) def. Lavington Saints 9.10 (64) at Sandy Creek.
- 1975: Mitta United 14.15 (99) def. Tallangatta 13.20 (98) at Sandy Creek.
- 1976: Kiewa-Sandy Creek 20.16 (136) def. Bullioh Valley 12.9 (81) at Sandy Creek.
- 1977: Kiewa-Sandy Creek 13.22 (100) def. Yackandandah 11.14 (80) at Martin Park, Wodonga.
- 1978: Mitta United 10.10 (70) def. Tallangatta Valley 7.13 (55) at Sandy Creek.
- 1979: Tallangatta Valley 12.15 (87) def. Kiewa-Sandy Creek 10.7 (67) at Sandy Creek.
- 1980: Tallangatta Valley 20.10 (130) def. Wodonga Demons 13.11 (89) at Sandy Creek.
- 1981: Kiewa-Sandy Creek 12.9 (81) def. Tallangatta Valley 8.12 (60) at Sandy Creek.
- 1982: Mitta United 20.20 (140) def. Culcairn 11.4 (70) at Sandy Creek.
- 1983: Kiewa-Sandy Creek 12.10 (82) drew with Holbrook 11.16 (82) at Sandy Creek.
  - (Replay) Kiewa-Sandy Creek 15.14 (104) def. Holbrook 8.9 (57) at Sandy Creek.
- 1984: Kiewa-Sandy Creek: 20.18 (138) def. Culcairn 15.16 (106) at Sandy Creek.
- 1985: Holbrook 22.17 (149) def. Wodonga Demons 13.6 (84) at Sandy Creek.
- 1986: Mitta United 17.14 (116) def. Kiewa-Sandy Creek 7.11 (53) at Sandy Creek.
- 1987: Wodonga Demons 15.13 (103) def. Mitta United 14.13 (97) at Sandy Creek.
- 1988: Mitta United 14.16 (100) def. Holbrook 10.11 (71) at Sandy Creek.
- 1989: Tallangatta Valley 13.13 (91) def. Holbrook 8.12 (60) at Sandy Creek.
- 1990: Culcairn 12.14 (86) def. Tallangatta Valley 8.15 (63) at Sandy Creek.
- 1991: Holbrook 16.12 (108) def. Bethanga 14.11 (95) at Sandy Creek.
- 1992: Mitta United 11.6 (72) def. Barnawartha 7.11 (53) at Sandy Creek.
- 1993: Mitta United 14.8 (92) def. Tallangatta Valley 14.2 (86) at Sandy Creek.
- 1994: Tallangatta Valley 19.17 (131) def. Kiewa-Sandy Creek 10.18 (78) at Sandy Creek.
- 1995: Kiewa-Sandy Creek 17.11 (113) def. Mitta United 8.8 (56) at Sandy Creek.
- 1996: Mitta United 13.7 (85) def. Tallangatta Valley 12.11 (83) at Sandy Creek.
- 1997: Tallangatta Valley 15.10 (100) def. Mitta United 7.15 (57) at Sandy Creek.
- 1998: Tallangatta Valley 10.16 (76) def. Dederang-Mt. Beauty 4.4 (28) at Sandy Creek.
- 1999: Dederang-Mt. Beauty 15.13 (103) def Kiewa-Sandy Creek 13.9 (87) at Sandy Creek
- 2000: Yackandandah 17.19 (121) def. Barnawartha 17.9 (111) at Sandy Creek.
- 2001: Dederang-Mt. Beauty 17.9 (111) def. Barnawartha 12.13 (85) at Sandy Creek.
- 2002: Barnawartha 21.17 (143) def. Tallangatta Valley 9.9 (63) at Sandy Creek.
- 2003: Dederang-Mt. Beauty 19.10 (124) def. Mitta United 9.10 (64) at Sandy Creek.
- 2004: Mitta United 5.18 (48) def. Wodonga Saints 2.8 (20) at Sandy Creek.
- 2005: Mitta United 11.15 (81) def. Dederang-Mt. Beauty 6.8 (44) at Sandy Creek.
- 2006: Mitta United 9.5 (59) def. Chiltern 7.8 (50) at Sandy Creek.
- 2007: Mitta United 8.7 (55) def. Kiewa-Sandy Creek 7.12 (54) at Sandy Creek.
- 2008: Kiewa-Sandy Creek 14.28–112 def Dederang-Mt. Beauty 11.12–78 at Sandy Creek.
- 2009: Tallangatta 13.10–88 def Beechworth 8.15–63 at Sandy Creek.
- 2010: Beechworth 18.9 (117) def. Yackandandah 12.5 (77) at Sandy Creek.
- 2011: Kiewa-Sandy Creek 15.6 (96) def. Thurgoona 11.6 (72) at Sandy Creek.
- 2012: Mitta United 18.11 (119) def. Thurgoona 8.12 (60) at Sandy Creek.
- 2013: Barnawartha 13.14 (92) def. Mitta United 11.6 (72) at Sandy Creek.
- 2014: Kiewa-Sandy Creek 16.12 (108) def. Mitta United 14.7 (91) at Sandy Creek.
- 2015: Tallangatta 10.8 (68) drew with Kiewa-Sandy Creek 8.20 (68) at Sandy Creek.
  - (A.E.T.) Tallangatta 11.10 (76) def. Kiewa-Sandy Creek 9.21 (75) at Sandy Creek.
- 2016: Thurgoona 18.20 (128) def. Mitta United 10.8 (68) at Sandy Creek.
- 2017: Thurgoona 22.10 (142) def. Kiewa-Sandy Creek 8.9 (57) at Sandy Creek.
- 2018: Kiewa-Sandy Crrek 14.16 (100) def. Thurgoona 9.8 (62) at Sandy Creek.
- 2019: Thurgoona 21.7 (133) def. Barnawartha 9.8 (62) at Sandy Creek.
- 2020: League in recess due to COVID-19 pandemic
- 2021: 1st: Yackandandah; 2nd: Chiltern. No finals series due to COVID-19
- 2022: Chiltern 4.9 (33) def. Kiewa Sandy Creek 2.5 (23) at Sandy Creek.
- 2023: Chiltern 10.9 (69) def. Kiewa Sandy Creek 9.12 (66) at Sandy Creek.
- 2024: Yackandandah: 10.11 (71) v Chiltern: 7.5 (47) at Sandy Creek.

=== Reserves ===
Football – Reserves: 1968 to present

Currently twelve of the reserve's grand final scores are undocumented and as such unknown. They are the – 1984, 1986, 1987, 1989 & 2017 Grand Finals.

- 1968: Lavington 12.11 (83) def. Tallangatta 5.9 (39) at Sandy Creek.
- 1969: Barnawartha 10.11 (71) def. Lavington 4.5 (29) at Tallangatta.
- 1970: Lavington 10.8 (68) def. Kiewa-Sandy Creek 7.6 (48) at Barnawartha.
- 1971: Lavington 7.10 (53) def. Kiewa-Sandy Creek 5.13 (43) at Sandy Creek.
- 1972: Lavington 5.6 (36) def. Mitta United 4.10 (34) at Sandy Creek.
- 1973: Tallangatta 13.10 (88) def. Dederang 6.13 (49) at Sandy Creek.
- 1974: Kiewa Sandy Creek 8.2 (50) def. Mitta United 7.7 (49) at Sandy Creek.
- 1975: Lavington 11.8 (74) def. Mitta United 5.5 (35) at Sandy Creek.
- 1976: Dederang-Mt. Beauty 8.10 (58) def. Kiewa-Sandy Creek 8.5 (53) at Sandy Creek.
- 1977: Kiewa Sandy Creek 10.11 (71) def. Mitta United 9.5 (59) at Martin Park, Wodonga.
- 1978: Mitta United 10.5 (65) def. Tallangatta Valley 8.5 (53) at Sandy Creek.
- 1979: Kiewa-Sandy Creek 11.14 (80) def. Mitta United 7.10 (52) at Sandy Creek.
- 1980: Kiewa-Sandy Creek 9.9 (63) def. Barnawartha 4.8 (36) at Sandy Creek.
- 1981: Kiewa-Sandy Creek 11.16 (82) def. Tallangatta Valley 6.8 (44) at Sandy Creek.
- 1982: Wodonga Demons 16.9 (105) def. Culcairn 14.9 (93) at Sandy Creek.
- 1983: Barnawartha 9.23 (77) def. Kiewa Sandy Creek 11.8 (74) at Sandy Creek.
- 1984: Wodonga Demons d Barnawartha
- 1985: Mitta United: 13.18 (96) def. Holbrook 13.16 (94) at Sandy Creek.
- 1986: Mitta United d Kiewa Sandy Creek
- 1987: Tallangatta Valley d Kiewa Sandy Creek
- 1988: Mitta United 9.6 (60) def. Wodonga Demons 8.10 (58) at Sandy Creek.
- 1989: Yackandandah def. Mitta United
- 1990: Yackandandah 12.10 (82) def. Culcairn 9.9 (63) at Sandy Creek.
- 1991: Culcairn 16.12 (108) def. Yackandandah 8.11 (59) at Sandy Creek.
- 1992: Holbrook 6.14 (50) def. Tallangatta Valley 4.5 (29) at Sandy Creek.
- 1993: Kiewa-Sandy Creek 12.10 (82) def. Tallangatta Valley 12.7 (79) at Sandy Creek.
- 1994: Yackandandah 16.11 (107) def. Tallangatta Valley 11.4 (70) at Sandy Creek.
- 1995: Mitta United 5.8 (38) def. Thurgoona 4.6 (30) at Sandy Creek.
- 1996: Mitta United 10.6 (66) def. Tallangatta Valley 6.10 (46) at Sandy Creek.
- 1997: Mitta United 7.11 (53) def. Kiewa-Sandy Creek 4.6 (30) at Sandy Creek.
- 1998: Barnawartha 6.9 (45) def. Mitta United 4.10 (34) at Sandy Creek.
- 1999: Dederang-Mt. Beauty 7.6 (48) def. Yackandandah 6.4 (40) at Sandy Creek.
- 2000: Yackandandah 10.10 (70) "def." Barnawartha 5.5 (35) at Sandy Creek.
- 2001: Yackandandah 9.8 (62) "def." Barnawartha 5.10 (40) at Sandy Creek.
- 2002: Barnawartha 9.6 (60) def. Mitta United 9.4 (58) at Sandy Creek.
- 2003: Mitta United 9.6 (60) def. Yackandandah 7.6 (48) at Sandy Creek
- 2004: Mitta United 5.3 (33) def. Dederang-Mt. Beauty 3.10 (28) at Sandy Creek.
- 2005: Mitta United 10.13 (73) def. Kiewa-Sandy Creek 6.4 (40) at Sandy Creek.
- 2006: Kiewa-Sandy Creek 3.11 (29) def. Barnawartha 2.3 (15) at Sandy Creek.
- 2007: Kiewa-Sandy Creek 9.11 (65) def. Barnawartha 6.1 (37) at Sandy Creek.
- 2008: Mitta United 10.10 (70) def. Barnawartha 6.5 (41) at Sandy Creek.
- 2009: Tallangatta 11.9 (75) def. Kiewa-Sandy Creek 8.5 (53) at Sandy Creek.
- 2010: Wahgunyah 9.6 (60) 'def. Yackandandah 9.5 (59) at Sandy Creek.
- 2011: Thurgoona 12.15 (87) def. Wahgunyah 10.3 (63) at Sandy Creek.
- 2012: Thurgoona 15.13 (103) def. Chiltern 6.13 (49) at Sandy Creek.
- 2013: Thurgoona 8.9 (57) def. Mitta United 5.9 (39) at Sandy Creek.
- 2014: Thurgoona 9.6 (60) def. Mitta United 7.4 (46) at Sandy Creek.
- 2015: Thurgoona: 14.6 (90) - Tallangatta: 8.5 (53) at Sandy Creek.
- 2016: Kiewa-Sandy Creek 11.6 (72) def. Thurgoona 11.5 (71) at Sandy Creek.
- 2017: Final scores not published in Border Mail (11/9/17):(Yackandandah & Thurgoona drew)
  - (A.E.T.) Yackandandah 10.7 (67) def. Thurgoona 8.7 (55)
- 2018: Thurgoona 12.8 (80) def. Tallangatta 4.12 (36) at Sandy Creek.
- 2019: Yackandandah 6.15 (51) def. Thurgoona 7.7 (49) at Sandy Creek.
- 2020: League in recess due to COVID-19 pandemic
- 2021: 1st: Kiewa Sandy Creek 2nd: Yackandandah No finals series due to COVID-19
- 2022: Chiltern 9.3 (57) def. Kiewa Sandy Creek 5.6 (36) at Sandy Creek.
- 2023: Chiltern 12.8 (80) def. Yackandandah 4.2 (26) at Sandy Creek.
- 2024: Yackandandah 9.14 (68) def. Chiltern 6.5 (41) at Sandy Creek.
- 2025: Kiewa Sandy Creek 15.4 (94) def. Yackandandah 5.6 – (36) at Sandy Creek.
- 2026: Kiewa Sandy Creek 7.6 (48) def. Barnawartha 6.8 – (44) at Sandy Creek.

=== Thirds ===
Football – Thirds (Under 17's): 1974 to present

Currently thirteen of the third's grand final scores details are undocumented and as such unknown. They are the – 1978, 1984, 1986, 1987 & 1989 Grand Finals.

- 1974: Lavington Lions 5.5 (32) def. Tallangatta 5.2 (32) at Sandy Creek.
- 1975: Lavington 8.9 (57) def. Mitta United 7.9 (51) at Sandy Creek.
- 1976: Lavington 10.6 (66) def. Dederang-Mt. Beauty 4.6 (30) at Sandy Creek.
- 1977: Tallangatta 8.6 (54) def. Wodonga Demons 7.3 (45) at Martin Park, Wodonga.
- 1978: Tallangatta Valley d Dederang Mt Beauty Details missing
- 1979: Tallangatta Valley 13.11 (89) def. Mitta United 4.7 (31) at Sandy Creek.
- 1980: Mitta United 9.6 (60) def Wodonga Demons 5.9 – (39) at Sandy Creek.
- 1981: Wodonga Demons 8.11 (59) def. Kiewa-Sandy Creek 6.7 (43) at Sandy Creek.
- 1982: Tallangatta Valley 11.2 (68) def. Bethanga 10.6 (66) at Sandy Creek.
- 1983: Army Apprentices School 8.6 (54) def. Tallangatta 8.1 (49) at Sandy Creek.
- 1984: Army Apprentices School d Wodonga Demons Details missing (Wodonga Demons grand finalists)
- 1985: Kiewa-Sandy Creek 9.10 (64) def. Dederang-Mt. Beauty 7.6 (48) at Sandy Creek.
- 1986: Wodonga Demons d Mt Beauty Details missing
- 1987: Wodonga Demons d Barnawartha Details missing
- 1988: Wodonga Demons 15.13 (103) def. Barnawartha 8.0 (48) at Sandy Creek.
- 1989: Culcairn d Dederang Mt Beauty Details missing
- 1990: Culcairn 14.11 (95) def. Tallangatta Valley 7.5 (47) at Sandy Creek.
- 1991: Culcairn 7.9 (51) def. Tallangatta Valley 7.8 (50) at Sandy Creek.
- 1992: Tallangatta Valley 8.7 (55) def. Kiewa-Sandy Creek 5.4 (34) at Sandy Creek.
- 1993: Tallangatta Valley 8.4 (52) def. Barnawartha 7.8 (50) at Sandy Creek.
- 1994: Tallangatta Valley 12.8 (80) def. Barnawartha 9.5 (59) at Sandy Creek.
- 1995: Tallangatta Valley 6.7 (43) def. Kiewa-Sandy Creek 1.4 (10) at Sandy Creek.
- 1996: Tallangatta Valley 6.5 (41) def. Barnawartha 3.2 (23) at Sandy Creek.
- 1997: Kiewa-Sandy Creek 6.4 (40) def. Tallangatta Valley 5.6 (36) at Sandy Creek.
- 1998: Thurgoona 7.5 (47) def. Dederang-Mt. Beauty 5.3 (33) at Sandy Creek.
- 1999: Thurgoona 11.12 (78) def. Tallangatta Valley 5.6 (36) at Sandy Creek.
- 2000: Kiewa Sandy Creek 14.9 (93) def. Dederang Mt Beauty 3.1 (19) at Sandy Creek.
- 2001: Dederang Mt Beauty 7.2 (44) def. Barnawartha 3.4 (22) at Sandy Creek.
- 2002: Barnawartha 8.3 (51) def. Mitta United 6.5 (41) at Sandy Creek.
- 2003: Kiewa Sandy Creek 5.8 (38) def. Mitta United 4.9 (33) at Sandy Creek.
- 2004: Barnawartha 2.5 (17) def. Tallangatta Valley 2.2 (14) at Sandy Creek.
- 2005: Barnawartha 12.10 (82) def. Kiewa-Sandy Creek 1.3 (9) at Sandy Creek.
- 2006: Kiewa-Sandy Creek 10.12 (72) def. Beechworth 3.8 (26) at Sandy Creek.
- 2007: Beechworth 9.8 (62) def. Kiewa-Sandy Creek 7.9 (51) at Sandy Creek.
- 2008: Barnawartha 11.12 (78) def. Beechworth 6.9 (45) at Sandy Creek.
- 2009: Wodonga Saints 11.5 (71) def. Beechworth 10.8 (68) at Sandy Creek.
- 2010: Tallangatta 10.5 (65) def. Rutherglen 6.8 (44) at Sandy Creek.
- 2011: Kiewa-Sandy Creek 12.14 (86) def. Chiltern 5.9 (39) at Sandy Creek.
- 2012: Wahgunyah 12.10 (82) def. Thurgoona 7.5 (47) at Sandy Creek.
- 2013: Mitta United 7.13 (55) def. Rutherglen 4.9 (33) at Sandy Creek.
- 2014: Barnawartha .13 (61) def. Mitta United 6.10 (46) at Sandy Creek.
- 2015: Yackandandah 11.7 (73) def. Mitta United 9.11 (65) at Sandy Creek.
- 2016: Yackandandah 15.16 (106) def. Tallangatta 6.3 (39) at Sandy Creek.
- 2017: Yackandandah 12.11 (83) def. Tallangatta 9.4 (58) at Sandy Creek.
- 2018: Tallangatta 6.9 (45) def. Yackandandah 4.9 (33) at Sandy Creek.
- 2019: Tallangatta 9.7 (61) def. Kiewa-Sandy Creek 4.12 (36) at Sandy Creek.
- 2020: League in recess due to COVID-19 pandemic
- 2021: 1st: Barnawartha 2nd: Thurgoona No finals series due to COVID-19
- 2022: Barnawartha 12.7 (79) def. Yackandandah 0.3 (3)
- 2023: Kiewa Sandy Creek 8.11 (69) def. Rutherglen 5.9 (39)
- 2024: Yackandandah 9.7 (61) def. Kiewa Sandy Creek 8.10 (58)
- 2025: Rutherglen 12.9 (81) def. Mitta United 7.5 (47)
- 2026: Thurgoona 9.17 (71) def. Yackandandah 4.2 (26)

=== Fourths ===
Football – Fourths (Under 14's): 1980 to present

Currently eleven of the fourth's grand final scores are undocumented and as such unknown. They are the – 1984, 1986, 1987 & 1989 Grand Finals.

- 1980: Mitta United 3.8 (26) def. Barnwartha 2.3 (15) at Sandy Creek.
- 1981: Kiewa Sandy Creek 5.5 (35) def. Mitta United 2.7 (19) at Sandy Creek.
- 1982: Kiewa-Sandy Creek 4.8 (32) def. Bethanga 2.1 (13) at Sandy Creek.
- 1983: Kiewa Sandy Creek 2.6 (18) def. Tallangatta Valley 2.0 (12) at Sandy Creek.
- 1984: Wodonga Demons d Tallangatta Valley Details missing
- 1985: Wodonga Demons 9.14 (68) def. Yackandandah 0.2 (2) at Sandy Creek.
- 1986: Wodonga Demons d Culcairn Details missing
- 1987: Culcairn d Dederang Mt Beauty Details missing
- 1988: Culcairn 2.7 (19) def. Kiewa-Sandy Creek 2.2 (14) at Sandy Creek.
- 1989: Tallangatta Valley d Holbrook Details missing
- 1990: Culcairn 2.1 (13) def. Tallangatta Valley 0.2 (2) at Sandy Creek.
- 1991: Tallangatta Valley 5.4 (34) def. Yackandandah 1.1 (7) at Sandy Creek.
- 1992: Tallangatta Valley 4.5 (29) def. Yackandandah 3.4 (22) at Sandy Creek.
- 1993: Tallangatta Valley 5.9 (39) def. Barnawartha 4.5 (29) at Sandy Creek.
- 1994: Tallangatta Valley 9.20 (74) def. Barnawartha 0.2 (2) at Sandy Creek.
- 1995: Tallangatta Valley 8.7 (55) def. Mitta United 4.0 (24) at Sandy Creek.
- 1996: Tallangatta Valley 3.8 (26) def. Thurgoona 3.3 (21) at Sandy Creek.
- 1997: Thurgoona 3.3 (21) def. Kiewa-Sanndy Creek 3.2 (20) at Sandy Creek.
- 1998: Dederang-Mt. Beauty 3.11 (29) def. Kiewa-Sanndy Creek 1.2 (8) at Sandy Creek.
- 1999: Dederang-Mt. Beauty 5.3 (33) def. Barnawartha 3.2 (20) at Sandy Creek.
- 2000: Mitta United 5.6 (36) def. Tallangatta Valley 4.4 (28) at Sandy Creek.
- 2001: Mitta United 10.13 (73) def. Tallangatta Valley 0.2 (2) at Sandy Creek.
- 2002: Barnawartha 11.9 (75) def. Kiewa-Sandy Creek 1.2 (8) at Sandy Creek.
- 2003: Dederang-Mt. Beauty 4.8 (32) def. Kiewa-Sanndy Creek 3.1 (19) at Sandy Creek.
- 2004: Mitta United 2.8 (28) def. Kiewa-Sandy Creek 4.3 (27) at Sandy Creek.
- 2005: Kiewa-Sandy Creek 9.5 (59) def. Mitta United 1.5 (11) at Sandy Creek.
- 2006: Kiewa-Sandy Creek 1.2 (8) def. Barnawartha 0.7 (7) at Sandy Creek.
- 2007: Rutherglen 5.10 (40) def. Yackandandah 5.7 (37) at Sandy Creek.
- 2008: Beechworth 7.10 (52) def. Yackandandah 3.12 (30) at Sandy Creek.
- 2009: Wahgunyah 4.4 (28) def. Thurgoona 4.3 (27) at Sandy Creek.
- 2010: Wahgunyah 6.5 (41) def. Rutherglen 6.4 (40) at Sandy Creek.
- 2011: Mitta United 7.4 (46) def. Chiltern 3.4 (22) at Sandy Creek.
- 2012: Wahgunyah 9.1 (55) def. Mitta United 7.4 (46) at Sandy Creek.
- 2013: Dederang-Mt. Beauty 6.6 (42) def. Tallangatta 2.3 (15) at Sandy Creek.
- 2014: Thurgoona 7.6 (48) def. Dederang-Mt. Beauty 6.10 (46) at Sandy Creek.
- 2015: Thurgoona 8.7 (55) def. Beechworth 4.6 (30) at Sandy Creek.
- 2016: Yackandandah 9.7 (61) def. Thurgoona 3.4 (22) at Sandy Creek.
- 2017: Beechworth 3.3 (21) drew with Thurgoona 3.3 (21) at Sandy Creek.
  - (A.E.T.) Beechworth 4.4 (28) def. Thurgoona 3.3 (21) at Sandy Creek.
- 2018: Wahgunyah 8.8 (56) def. Barnawartha 5.9 (39) at Sandy Creek.
- 2019: Tallangatta 5.8 (38) def. Chiltern 4.10 (34) at Sandy Creek
- 2020: League in recess due to COVID-19 pandemic
- 2021: 1st: Thurgoona 2nd: Kiewa Sandy Creek
- 2022: Chiltern 4.4 (28) def. Yackandandah 3.5 (23)
- 2023: Dederang Mt Beauty 4.10 (34) def. Yackandandah 4.7 (31)
- 2024: Yackandandah 11.2 (68) def. Wodonga Saints 2.3 (15)
- 2025: Thurgoona 7.14 (56) def. Yackandandah 1.6 (12)
- 2026: Yackandandah 7.3 (45) def. Thurgoona 5.1 (31)

- Netball – A Grade: 1980 to present
- Netball – B Grade: 1980 to present
- Netball – C Grade: 2013 to present
- Netball – D Grade (18 & Under): 1992 to present
- Netball – E Grade (15 & Under): 1992 to present
- Netball – F Grade (13 & Under): 1992 to present

== Best & Fairest / Leading Goalkicker Medalists ==
In 1945, Mr. James A. Paton from the Fervale FC, initially donated the prize for the Tallangatta & DFL best and fairest award and the Paton family continued this on for many years afterwards. The initial best and fairest award, was a cash prize of £5, then later changed to the J A Paton Trophy.

In 1946, Granya's Norm Webb polled a record 40 votes in the T&DFL best and fairest award.

Who won the T&DFL medal in 1951? In the official 2024 T&DFL grand final match day Football Record edition has an A. Kimball (Bethanga) winning in 1951, but Bethanga did not enter a team in the T&DFL in 1951 and an A. Kimball played for North Albury from 1951 to 1953. An A. Kimball (Bethanga Captain-Coach) won the T&DFL best and fairest award in 1954, but unfortunately there appears to be no old newspaper articles to confirm who won the T&DFL best and fairest award in 1951.

The T&DFNL senior football best and fairest award was later changed to the Barton Medal in 1977, after three times best and fairest winner, George Barton died after a short battle with cancer.

Between 1959 and 1969 the following four player's tied with the winner on votes, but were deemed as the runner up under the old count back system in –

- 1959 – John O'Donnell (Bandiana)
- 1961 – Eric Tye (Bogong)
- 1964 – Hugh Earnshaw (Yackandandah) and
- 1969 – Geoff Doubleday (Dederang).

To this day (2026), these player's medal "wins" has never been acknowledged, and they have never received a retrospective medal from the T&DFL. Ironically the official "runners up" in 1985 and 1991 have all received a retrospective medal, but not in 1959, 1961, 1964 and 1969.

Multiple T&DFL Best & Fairest Winners

- 4 – Albert "Bert" Kemp (Sandy Creek): 1952, 1956, 1957, 1958. 2nd in 1954 and 1955. Kemp also won the 1949 – Yackandandah & DFL best and fairest award (Sandy Creek FC).
- 4 – Laurie McInnes (Holbrook): 1987, 1991, 1992, 1993. (McIness also won two Upper Murray FL best & fairest awards in 1999 & 2000 with Federal FC).
- 4 – Cameron McNeill (Barnawartha): 2008, 2013, 2014, 2018.
- 3 – George Barton: (1962 & 1963 – Bogong FC, 1971 – Bogong/Tawonga FC) Barton only ever finished as the runner up once in the T&DFL best and fairest and that was in 1968, three votes behind the winner. Barton never lost a T&DFL senior football best and fairest under the old count back system. Refer to and click on the newspaper references via the table below for actual documented facts.
- 3 – Alan Curtis: (1977 – Tallangatta FC, 1979 – Bethanga FC, 1982 – Holbrook FC)
- 3 – Hughie Giltrap (Mitta United): 1988, 1989, 1991.
- 3 – Brett Harrison (Tallangatta Valley): 1994, 1995, 1996. (Harrison also won the 1993 Coreen & District Football League best and fairest award with Rand FC).
- 2 – Norm Webb (Granya): 1946, 1950. Webb also won a Kiewa & Mitta Valleys FA medal in 1940 (Granya FC), O&MFNL Morris Medal in 1952 (Wodonga FC) & a Hume FNL Azzi Medal in 1955 (Jindera FC).
- 2 – Travis Tyler (Yackandandah): 1997, 1998.
- 2 – Simon Corr (Yackandandah): 2001, 2004.
- 2 – Jarrod Farwell (2016 – Rutherglen FC, 2024 – Barnawartha FC).
- 2 – Cam Fendyk (Beechworth): 2024, 2025.

=== Seniors ===
Football – SENIORS: 1945 to present

Senior Football: Best & Fairest				Leading Goalkicker Medallist		
Year	Votes	Best & Fairest	Club	Goals	Leading Goalkicker	Club
Dederang & DFA: Best & Fairest
1939	16	Les Miller	Sandy Creek			
Kiewa & Mitta Valleys FA: Best & Fairest
1940	12	W Hodgkin; Norm Webb	Mitta Mitta; Granya			
1941 – 43		In recess > World War II				
Mitta Valley Patriotic FA: Best & Fairest
1944	?	Fraser Paton	Fernvale			
Tallangatta & DFL Best & Fairest: James A. Paton Trophy
1945	5	1st: Stuart Paton	Fernvale	?	Stuart Paton	Fernvale
	3	2nd: Reg Gard; 2nd: Digger Lorenz; 2nd: B Park	Granya; Tallangatta; Bethanga			
1946	40	1st: Norm Webb	Granya			
	16	2nd: W. "Billy" Dugan	Tallangatta			
1947	?	Colin Scales	Mitta Town			
1948	20	W L "Raff" Webb	Mitta Town			
	18	2nd: Jim Star	Granya			
1949	18	1st: Allan Gard	Granya	31	Garth Butler	Tallangatta
	10	2nd: Stuart Paton	Fernvale			
1950	?	Norm Webb	Granya			
1951		?	No Bethanga FC in '51	27	W Campbell	Sandy Creek
1952	24	1st: A Kemp	Sandy Creek	41	Reg Webb	Tallangatta
	14	2nd: R Grealy; 2nd: S Leigh	Fernvale; Bandiana			
1953	32	Percy Appleyard	RAEME FC (Bandiana)	94 (98)	L Larkin	Mitta United
	30	2nd: J Marks	Mitta			
1954	22	1st: A T Kimball	Bethanga	?	?	?
	21	2nd: A Kemp; 2nd: W J O'Brien	Sandy Creek; Kiewa			
1955	25	1st: John Riddington	Tallangatta	72+	Jack McNamara	Kiewa
	22	2nd: Bert Kemp	Sandy Creek			
1956	?	Bert Kemp	Sandy Creek	?	?	?
1957	22	Bert Kemp; Jack McNamara	Sandy Creek; Kiewa	120	Kelley	Kergunyah
	16	2nd: John Riddington	Tallangatta			
1958	?	1st: Bert Kemp	Sandy Creek	100+	Norm Benstead	Bethanga/Granya Bombers
	?	2nd: Max Mitchell	Bethanga/Granya Bombers			
1959	22 (22)	1st: Neville Hadley; 2nd: John O'Donnell*	Kiewa; Bandiana	?	?	?
1960	22	1st: Eric Tye	Bogong	?	?	?
	20	2nd: Doug Wellasden	Barnawartha			
1961	20 (20)	1st: Errol Barton; 2nd: Eric Tye*	Dederang; Bogong	?	?	?
1962	25	George Barton	Bogong		?	?
1963	29	1st: George Barton	Bogong	75	Ray Thomas	Lavington
	21	2nd: C Paganoni	Barnarwartha			
1964	26 (26)	1st: Reg Pooley; 2nd: Hugh Earnshaw*	Barnawartha; Yackandandah	?	?	?
	23	3rd: George Barton	Bogong			
1965	35	1st: Brian Condon	Tallangatta	?	?	?
		2nd: ?				
1966	32	1st: Des Dower	Mitta United	?	?	?
	23	2nd: Geoff Doubleday	Dederang			
1967	23	1st: Geoff Doubleday	Dederang	?	?	?
	20	2nd: G Duncombe	Lavington			
1968	22	1st: Neville Jarvis	Kergunyah	?	?	?
	19	2nd: George Barton	Bogong			
1969	20 (20)	1st: George Skepper; 2nd: Geoff Doubleday*	Kergunyah; Dederang	?	?	?
	19	3rd: Alan Rogers	Kiewa Sandy Creek			
1970	23	1st: Don Stanley	Bullioh Valley	?	?	?
	20	2nd: Mac Paton	Tallangatta			
1971	18	1st: George Barton	Bogong Tawonga	?	?	?
	17	2nd: Don Stanley	Bullioh			
1972	30	1st: John Lease	Yackandandah	?	?	?
	29	2nd: Mac Paton	Tallangatta			
1973	31	1st: Max Urquhart	Lavington	?	?	?
	30	2nd: John Lease	Yackandandah			
1974	33	1st: Derek Taylor	Dederang	?	?	?
	19	2nd: Leon Svarc	Bogong Tawonga			
1975	23	1st: Leon Svarc	Mt Beauty	120	Frank Hodgkin	Mitta United
	18	2nd: John Lease	Yackandandah			
1976	17	1st: Gary Fox	Mitta United	101	Russell Sawyer	Lavington
	15	2nd: Stewart Wood	Bethanga			
Tallangatta & DFL Best & Fairest: George Barton Medal
1977	17	Alan Curtis	Tallangatta	65	Michael Broadhead	Bethanga
	(17)	Dennis Hutton*	South Albury			
1978	19	1st: Tony Heather	South Albury	73	Kevin Smith	Yackandandah
	16	2nd: Alan Curtis	Bethanga			
1979	28	1st: Alan Curtis	Bethanga	73	David Nichol	Tallangatta Valley
	21	2nd: Tony Heather	South Albury			
1980	26	1st: Greg Hooper	Barnawartha	93	Ashley Bates	Wodonga Demons
	24	2nd: Paul Stripeikas	Dederang My Beauty			
1981	?	D Sheather	Bethanga	80	Des Richardson	Kiewa-Sandy Creek
1982	?	Alan Curtis	Holbrook	112	Ashley Bates	Wodonga Demons
1983	?	Peter Clayton	Holbrook	81	Owen Dunlop	Culcairn
1984	?	P Tobin	Mitta United	141	Peter Woodford	Barnawartha
1985	18	John Smith; Stuart Maddock†; Paul Rossiter†	Mitta United; Tallangatta Valley; Holbrook	102	Alan Bongetti	Bethanga
1986	?	C Andrew	Kiewa Sandy Creek	100	Alan Bongetti	Mitta United
1987	?	Laurie McInnes	Holbrook	88	Alan Bongetti	Mitta United
1988	?	Hugh Giltrap	Mitta United	76	Shane Dryden	Yackandandah
1989	?	Hugh Giltrap	Mitta United	70	Shane Dryden	Yackandandah
1990	26	1st: Laurie Larsen	Dederang Mt Beauty	76	Shane Dryden	Yackandandah
	18	2nd: Ross Hilliary	Holbrook			
1991	16	Jay McNeil; Hugh Giltrap†; Scott McGrath†; Laurie McInnes†	Yackandandah; Mitta United; Culcairn; Holbrook	65	Simon Hore	Bethanga
1992	?	Laurie McInnes	Holbrook	102	Ray Mack	Holbrook
1993	20	Laurie McInnes	Holbrook	88	Simon Hore	Bethanga
1994	18	Brett Harrison & Robert Mackinlay	Tallangatta Valley; Holbrook	70	Graeme Cook	Kiewa-Sandy Creek
1995	?	Brett Harrison	Tallangatta Valley	82	Brad Duncan	Mitta United
1996	?	Brett Harrison	Tallangatta Valley	76	Brad Duncan	Mitta United
1997	?	Travis Tyler	Yackandandah	104	Ross Hillary	Yackandandah
1998	?	Travis Tyler	Yackandandah	111	Troy Hawkins	Tallangatta Valley
1999	?	Ross Hedley	Yackandandah	100	Ross Hedley	Yackandandah
2000	?	Darren Mathey	Tallangatta Valley	84	Jamie Swinnerton	Mitta United
2001	22	1st: Simon Corr	Yackandandah	93	James Hodgkin	Dederang-Mt. Beauty
	18	2nd: Robbie Barber	Kiewa Sandy Creek			
2002	25	Des Anthony	Yackandandah	101	Matt Jones	Mitta United
2003	17	1st: Justin Nelson	Mitta United	63	Nathan Lappin	Chiltern
	14	2nd: Glenn Page	Dederang Mt Beauty			
2004	28	Simon Corr	Yackandandah	86	James Hodgkin	Dederang-Mt. Beauty
2005	23	Ben Davis	Rutherglen	100	Kris Shevlin	Barnawartha
2006	27	Aaron Purcell	Yackandandah	72	Jade Culph; Brett Ohlin	Mitta United; Dederang-Mt. Beauty
2007	20	Christopher Nelson	Mitta United	60	Derek Murray; Matt Jones	Thurgoona; Mitta United
2008	25	Cameron McNeill	Barnawartha	81	Brendan McEvoy	Mitta United
2009	24	John Paola	Yackandandah	75 (79)	Tiarnan Halliday	Beechworth
2010	27	Brayden Carey	Beechworth	75 (79)	Thomas Stead	Thurgoona
2011	28 (30)	Brenton Surrey; Ian Kay*	Beechworth; Rutherglen	121(125); 110(115); 90 (103)	1st: Peter Cook; 2nd: Anthony Pierri; 3rd: Thomas Stead	Barnawartha; Wahgunyah; Thurgoona
2012	?	Nathan Reynoldson	Mitta United	87	Trent Castles	Yackandandah
2013	25	Cameron McNeill	Barnawartha	101(110)	Daniel Bradshaw	Dederang Mt Beauty
2014	33	Cameron McNeill	Barnawartha	73 (86)	Samuel Cross	Thurgoona
2015	21	Jaise Coleman	Chiltern	108	Trent Castles	Yackandandah
2016	20	Jayden Kotzur; Jared Farwell	Thurgoona; Rutherglen	90	James Breen	Tallangatta
2017	27	Lee Dale	Yackandandah	111 102(115)	1st: Trent Castles; 2nd: Matthew Fowler	Kiewa Sandy Creek; Thurgoona
2018	31	Cameron McNeill	Barnawartha	83 (87)	Guy Telford	Kiewa Sandy Creek
2019	30	Scott Spencer	Tallangatta	125(131) 109	1st: Ricky Whitehead; 2nd: Trent Castles	Chiltern; Yackandandah
2020		T&DFL in recess >	COVID-19			
2021	15	Michael Rampal	Thurgoona	45	Mark Doolan	Chiltern
2022	33	Scott Meyer	Chiltern	72 (75)	Ethan Boxall	Chiltern
2023	26	1st: Cameron Fendyk	Beechworth	110	Ethan Redcliffe	Mitta United
	22	2nd: Zac Leitch	Yackandandah			
2024	22	Jarrad Farwell; Cameron Fendyk; Zac Leitch	Barnawartha; Beechworth; Yackandandah	76	James Breen	Tallangatta
2025	25 (29)	Marty Brennan; Zac Leitch*	Rutherglen; Yackandandah	98 (107)	Connor Newnham	Kiewa Sandy Creek
2026	26	Ben McIntosh	Yackandandah	102(104)	Guy Telford	Kiewa Sandy Creek
2027						
Year	Votes	Best & Fairest	Club	Goals	Leading Goalkicker	Club

- – † This symbol means that a retrospective medal was awarded.
- – () Brackets tally includes goals kicked in finals
- 1959: John O'Donnell (Bandiana) tied with the winner on votes, but finished as runner up on the old countback system, but has never received a retrospective medal from the T&DFNL.
- 1961: Eric Tye (Bogong) tied with the winner on votes, but finished as runner up on the old countback system, but has never received a retrospective medal from the T&DFNL.
- 1964: Hugh Earnshaw (Yackandandah) tied with the winner on votes, but finished as runner up on the old countback system, but has never received a retrospective medal from the T&DFNL.
- 1969: Geoff Doubleday (Dederang) tied with the winner on votes, but finished as runner up on the old countback system and has never received a retrospective medal from the T&DFNL.
- 1977: Dennis Hutton – (South Albury) tied with the winner on 17 votes, but was ineligible, due to a suspension during the 1977 football season.
- 2011: Ian Kay – (Rutherglen) polled 30 votes, but was ineligible, due to a Rd.15 striking suspension against Mitta United.
- 2025: Zac Leitch (Yackandandah) polled 29 votes, but was ineligible, due to a Rd.6 yellow card and report against Beechworth, which was then downgraded to a reprimand, with a guilty plea, which Leitch accepted.

=== Reserves ===
Football – RESERVES: 1968 to present

	RESERVES: Best & Fairest Medal			2nds: Leading Goalkicker Medallist		
Year	Votes	Player	Club	Goals	Player	Club
1968	10	Doug Alder	Bandiana			
1969	?	Nelson McIntosh	Yackandandah			
1970	14 (14) (14)	Ken Mumberson; George Barton*; Frank Cook*	Tallangatta; Bogong Tawonga; Barnawartha			
1971	15	Alan Pilkington	Bandiana			
1972	26	W Thomas	Lavington			
1973	26	P Humphreys	Bullioh			
1974	15	Des Clear	Lavington Lions			
1975	17	Shane Murtagh	Yackandandah			
1976	20	Tom Wink	Wodonga Demons			
1977		D Sutherland	Kiewa Sandy Creek			
1978		Ken Scott	Mitta			
1979	11	Robert White	Bethanga	54	I Hawkins	Kiewa Sandy Creek
1980	11; 11	Greg Baker; Mick Kirally	Kiewa Sandy Creek; Yackandandah	44	R Horsfall	?
1981		R Braybrook	Barnawartha	35	I Hawkins	Kiewa Sandy Creek
1982		R Braybrook	Barnawartha	53	P Brown	Culcairn
1983		B Manzie	Bethanga	32	G McLennan	Holbrook
1984		T Brooks	Wodonga Demons	58	P Worstling	Wodonga Demons
1985	14	Matthew Thompson	Mitta United	67	G McLennan	Holbrook
1986		B Pierning	Tallangatta Valley	36	I Hawkins	Kiewa Sandy Creek
1987		J Butler; G Lowcock	Mitta United; Tallangatta Valley	80	M Duncan	?
1988		M Thompson	Mitta United	56	G Gration	Tallangatta Valley
1989		G Vaia	Dederang Mt Beauty	55	G Gration	Tallangatta Valley
1990	24	Peter Tolsher	Tallangatta Valley	45	R Ellis	Dederang Mt Beauty
1991		Matthew Thompson	Mitta United	62	A Dyde	Culcairn
1992		S Patterson & Peter Tolsher	? Tallangatta Valley	47	A Hoffman	Bethanga
1993	18	Gavin Holt	Thurgoona	52	K Kelley	Yackandandah
1994	19	Gavin Holt	Thurgoona	59	B Croucher	Kiewa Sandy Creek
1995		P Bradbury	Thurgoona	44	J Burt; P Tobin	Tallangatta Valley; Mitta United
1996		D Smith	Tallangatta Valley	43	P Thornton	Holbrook
1997		G Butler	Mitta United	60	P Bird	Kiewa Sandy Creek
1998		R Perry	Barnawartha	63	D Plunkett	Dederang Mt Beauty
1999		R Perry	Barnawartha	62	K Vanduursen	Thurgoona
2000		C Andrew	Kiewa Sandy Creek	45	M O'Halloran	Barnawartha
2001	22	Richard Hay & Tim Bradbury	Mitta United; Thurgoona	66	T Hoffman	Barnawartha
2002		J Chesser	Barnawartha	66	Jason Chesser	Barnawartha
2003	23	Kane Harrison	Wodonga Saints	37	Craig Scammell	Barnawartha
2004		J McGrath	Kiewa Sandy Creek	38	Greg Pritchard	Chiltern
2005		A Anderson	Chiltern	67	David Bergowicz	Barnawartha
2006		A Anderson	Chiltern	42	Hayden Miles	Thurgoona
2007		C McBain	Mitta United	60	Luke Thompson	Kiewa Sandy Creek
2008		S Anderson	Chiltern	49	James Hodgkin	Mitta United
2009		M Alderman	Kiewa Sandy Creek	108 (116)	Tim Dinneen	Kiewa Sandy Creek
2010		A Fulton	Rutherglen	54 (56)	Nathan Arden	Barnawartha
2011		L Brookes	Chiltern	66	Sean Lappin	Chiltern
2012		J Fisher	Chiltern	60	Nathan Arden	Barnawartha
2013		M Brooks	Dederang Mt Beauty	65 (67)	Tom Barel	Dederang Mt. Beauty
2014		D Eames	Chiltern	70 (72)	Nathan Sariman	Kiewa Sandy Creek
2015	19	Troy Butler	Mitta United	72 (74)	Ben Taylor	Rutherglen
2016	21	Isaac Bunge	Tallangatta	59 (66)	Jamie Wolf	Kiewa Sandy Creek
2017	25	James Davies	Yackandandah	101(107)	Brett O'Rourke	Wahgunyah
2018	15	Angus Sutherland	Mitta United	67	Brendan Manson	Thurgoona
2019	20	David Avery	Tallangatta	67 (79)	Tim Phegan	Thurgoona
2020		T&DFNL in recess >	COVID-19			
2021	13	Murray Price	Chiltern	47	Tim Phegan	Thurgoona
2022	15	Nick Goznik	Dederang Mt. Beauty	65 (69)	Murray Price	Chiltern
2023	24	James Davies	Yackandandah	94 (98)	Murray Price	Chiltern
2024	18	James Davies	Yackandandah	91 (92)	Jarrod Williams	Barnawartha
2025	40	Daniel Quigley	Mitta United	55	Adam Harris	Kiewa Sandy Creek
2026	20	Cameron Newbold	Yackandandah	104	Mason O'Keeke	Barnawartha
2027						

- – () Brackets tally includes goals kicked in finals
- 1970 – Both George Barton (Bogong / Tawonga) and Frank Cook (Barnawartha) tied with the Reserves best and fairest winner on votes, but finished as runner up on the old countback system, but both have never received a retrospective medal from the T&DFNL.

=== Thirds ===
The Thirds competition was initially a Under 16's competition when commenced in 1974, but unsure what actual year it changed to an Under 17's competition.

Football – THIRDS (U/16's): 1974 to 198?. (U/17's) 198? to present

	THIRDS: Best & Fairest Medal			THIRDS: Leading Goalkicker Medallist		
Year	Votes	Player	Club	Goals	Player	Club
1974		?				
1975	20	Doug Mills	Lavington Lions			
1976	18	Leno Panozzo	Dederang Mt Beauty			
1977		P Warne	Wodonga Demons			
1978		Gavin Tighe	Dederang Mt Beauty			
1979	21	David Hovey; P Thompson†	Bethanga; Wodonga Demons	40	Darren Handley	Dederang Mt Beauty
1980	20	Graeme Rooney	Tallangatta Valley	26	G Vogel	Kiewa Sandy Creek
1981		D Shields; D O'Connell		33	G Vogel	Kiewa Sandy Creek
1982		J Carey	Culcairn		?	
1983		A Dove	Kiewa Sandy Creek	67	T McCormack	Tallangatta Valley
1984		P Hindle	Tallangatta Valley	39	D Bocquet	Tallangatta Valley
1985	19	Mouro Stefani	Dederang Mt Beauty	50	R Riley	Wodonga Demons
1986		T Ellis	Mitta United	77	James Hodgkin	Dederang Mt Beauty
1987		J Reid	Kiewa Sandy Creek		?	
1988		J Reid	Kiewa Sandy Creek	52	A Hill	Dederang Mt Beauty
1989		J Puttyfoot	Dederang Mt Beauty	62	B Lee	Culcairn
1990	33	Shane Hall	Tallangatta Valley	70	A Featherstone	Dederang Mt Beauty
1991		Darren Elliott	Mitta United	58	W Kendell	Tallangatta Valley
1992		L Bowran	Tallangatta Valley	40	M Burt	Tallangatta Valley
1993		Cade Brown	Tallangatta Valley	33	M Shaw	Bethanga
1994	20	Damian Britton	Kiewa Sandy Creek	58	J Milson	Tallangatta Valley
1995		B Milson & P Baker	Tallangatta Valley; Kiewa Sandy Creek	17	M Stockfield	Thurgoona
1996		B Milson	Tallangatta Valley	36	B Milson	Tallangatta Valley
1997		Ian Maiden	Thurgoona	65	Matthew Jones	Mitta United
1998		Ian Maiden	Thurgoona	45	G Kimball	Thurgoona
1999		J Thorton	Tallangatta Valley	30	R Wilson	Thurgoona
2000		J Thorton	Tallangatta Valley	41	N Schleibs	Kiewa Sandy Creek
2001	28	Josh Hogg	Yackandandah	38	C Chant	Barnawartha
2002		P Giltrip	Mitta United	49	Brad Steele	Mitta United
2003	19	Paul Cooper	Dederang Mt Beauty	55	Ryan Jenkins	Kiewa Sandy Creek
2004		D Eaton	Mitta United	39	Dan Goodrick	Tallangatta Valley
2005		D Simpson	Barnawartha	70	Sean Lappin	Chiltern
2006		R Fulton & M McNamara	Barnawartha; Barnawartha	104	John Spence	Barnawartha
2007		Kade Surrey	Beechworth	72	Chris Dove	Kiewa Sandy Creek
2008		E Roberts & Z Walker	Yackandandah; Wodonga Saints	82	Josh McCudden	Barnawartha
2009		B Murphy	Beechworth	77 (78)	Zac Walker	Wodonga Saints
2010		H Matthews	Yackandandah	50 (57)	Dylan Van Berlow	Rutherglen
2011		D Oates	Rutherglen	53 (56)	Wade Knight	Kiewa Sandy Creek
2012		Matt Brennan	Rutherglen	52 (60)	Tom Barel	Dederang Mt. Beauty
2013		Matt Brennan	Rutherglen	55	Ryan McGrath	Thurgoona
2014		Ben Paton	Mitta United	50	Taine Gilheany	Dederang Mt. Beauty
2015		Jesse Anderson	Mitta United	75 (83)	Tom Land	Kiewa Sandy Creek
2016	34	Rory Quinn	Tallangatta	56 (59)	Liam Vickers	Dederang Mt. Beauty
2017	29	Johann Jarratt	Yackandandah	163(175)	Jay Hillary	Yackandandah
2018	34	Connor Marshall	Yackandandah	57 (59)	Ray Farrugia	Yackandandah
2019	22	Jackson Spiers	Barnwartha	107(113)	Rory McClure	Kiewa Sandy Creek
2020		T&DFNL in recess >	COVID-19			
2021	18	Jim Lawson	Yackandandah	71	Beau Butters	Barnawartha
2022	33	Jim Lawson	Yackandandah	44 (57)	Eligh Houston-Damic	Kiewa Sandy Creek
2023	28	Jack Phegan	Thurgoona	56 (61)	Charlie Johnson	Kiewa Sandy Creek
2024	31	Rama Schultz	Chiltern	74	Charlie Johnson	Kiewa Sandy Creek
2025	32	Mitch Francis	Rutherglen	76	Ethan Wilson	Mitta United
2026	39	Jack Coulston	Dederang Mt Beauty	80	Fletcher Walsh	Thurgoona
2027						

- – () Brackets tally includes goals kicked in finals

=== Fourths ===
Football – FOURTHS (U/14's): 1980 to present

	FOURTHS: Best & Fairest Medal			FOURTHS: Leading Goalkicker Medallist		
Year	Votes	Player	Club	Goals	Player	Club
1980		?			?	
1981		D Chant	Barnawartha	23	D Smith	Holbrook
1982		G Grujic	Dederang Mt Beauty	39	G Reid	Kiewa Sandy Creek
1983		J Ruddy	Dederang Mt Beauty	50	S Dyde	Culcairn
1984		T McKindrick	Yackandandah	53	J Lee	Wodonga Demons
1985	37	Shayne Puttyfoot	Dederang Mt Beauty	45	A Reynolds	
1986		G Chesser	Wodonga Demons	43	G Chesser	
1987		T Presley	Wodonga Demons		?	
1988		B Hack & D Hinson	Yackandandah; Dederang Mt Beauty	34	G Maddock	Yackandandah
1989		B Haynes	Holbrook	47	A Holmes	Tallangatta Valley
1990	38	Andrew Britton	Yackandandah	60	A Britton	Yackandandah
1991		Dean Brooker	Culcairn	58	T Kennedy	Yackandandah
1992		D Watson	Yackandandah	44	B Deery	Kiewa Sandy Creek
1993		Anthony Harmer	Barnawartha	76	Anthony Harmer	Barnawartha
1994	32	Tim Williams	Yackandandah	59	T Chessari	Tallangatta Valley
1995		I Maiden	Thurgoona	37	G Webb	Tallangatta Valley
1996		A Murray	Thurgoona	36	B Baude	Mitta United
1997		C Jackson	Barnawartha	45	G Kimball	Thurgoona
1998		M Hill & S Anderson	Dederang Mt Beauty; Dederang Mt Beauty	35	M Hill	Dederang Mt Beauty
1999		W Gibson	Dederang Mt Beauty	45	T Grealy	Dederang Mt Beauty
2000		M Nichol	Tallangatta Valley	27	S Baude	Mitta United
2001	21	Will Nichol	Tallangatta Valley	27	F Iaria	Dederang Mt Beauty
2002		J Bartel	Kiewa Sandy Creek	45	Matt Ladgrove	Barnawartha
2003	27	Sam Livingstone	Tallangatta Valley	41	Ben Parker	Tallangatta Valley
2004		J Butler	Mitta United	63	Tom Heagney	Barnawartha
2005		N Kerlin	Rutherglen	59	Dan Hallihan	Kiewa Sandy CReek
2006		M Chamberlain	Rutherglen	56	Brayden Deas	Barnawartha
2007		J Shields	Kiewa Sandy Creek	44	Kade Dove	Kiewa Sandy Creek
2008		B Murphy	Beechworth	57	Ben Murphy	Beechworth
2009		P Stow	Dederang Mt Beauty	51(57); 51(54)	Cody Turner; Jayden Vandermeer	Wahgunyah; Chiltern
2010		J Heiner	Dederang Mt Beauty	56 (58)	Jack Aumont	Wahgunyah
2011		B Gayne	Wahgunyah	59 (61)	Brydon Robins	Wahgunyah
2012		N Munday	Beechworth	42	Ben Cook	Dederang Mt. Beauty
2013		Noah Amery	Tallangatta Valley	43	Liam Vickers	Dederang Mt. Beauty
2014		J Ellis	Mitta United	38 (44)	Liam Vickers	Dederang Mt. Beauty
2015	42	Jake Goodard	Wahgunyah	52 (53)	Jay Hillary	Yackandandah
2016	43	Ryan Bartel	Kiewa Sandy Creek	72 (77)	Ethan Patrala	Yackandandah
2017	40	Jacob Murphy	Chiltern	40 (42)	Tom Carter	Barnawartha
2018	41	Finn Osborne	Wahgunyah	51	Will Noonan	Barnawartha
2019	44	Nick Paton	Tallangatta	64	Justin Lewis	Rutherglen
2020		T&DFNL in recess >	COVID-19			
2021	20	Cody Spencer	Thurgoona	40	Luke Nicholson	Rutherglen
2022	38	Chad Brooks	Chiltern	58 (63)	Charlie Johnson	Kiewa Sandy Creek
2023	41	Oliver Boddenberg	Yackandandah	56 (59)	Jai Redmond	Dederang Mt Beauty
2024	47	Dustin Fisher	Rutherglen	60 (61)	Seth Chant	Wodonga Saints
2025	45	Rowan Jones	Dederang Mt Beauty	50	Parker Quarel	Thurgoona
2026	47	Harper Walker	Yackandandah	63	Harper Walker	Yackandandah
2027						

- – () Brackets tally includes goals kicked in finals

== Premiership years: 1945–2026 ==
	Tallangatta & District Football League: 1945 – to present day				Tallangatta & District Netball Association: 1980 – to present day					
Year	Seniors 1945–present	Reserves 1968–present	Thirds/U17's 1974–present	Fourths/U14's 1980–present	A-Grade: 1980–present day	B-Grade: 1980–present day	C-Grade: 2013 > present day	D-Grade (18's & Under)	E-Grade (15's & Under)	F-Grade (13's & Under)
1945	Tallangatta									
1946	Granya									
1947	Granya									
1948	Fernvale									
1949	Tallangatta									
1950	Bullioh Valley									
1951	Granya									
1952	Mitta United									
1953	Mitta United									
1954	Tallangatta									
1955	Kergunyah									
1956	Kergunyah									
1957	Kergunyah									
1958	Dederang									
1959	Mitta United									
1960	Mitta United									
1961	Mitta United									
1962	Dederang									
1963	Mitta United									
1964	Yackandandah									
1965	Lavington									
1966	Lavington									
1967	Mitta United	Commenced in 1968								
1968	Mitta United	Lavington								
1969	Kiewa Sandy Creek	Barnawartha								
1970	Kiewa Sandy Creek	Lavington								
1971	Lavington	Lavington								
1972	Kiewa Sandy Creek	Lavington								
1973	Mitta United	Tallangatta	Commenced in 1974							
1974	Tallangatta	Kiewa Sandy Creek	Lavington							
1975	Mitta United	Lavington	Lavington							
1976	Kiewa Sandy Creek	Dederang Mt Beauty	Lavington							
1977	Kiewa Sandy Creek	Kiewa Sandy Creek	Tallangatta							
1978	Mitta United	Mitta United	Tallangatta Valley							
1979	Tallangatta Valley	Kiewa-Sandy Creek	Tallangatta Valley	Commenced in 1980	Commenced in 1980	Commenced in 1980				
1980	Tallangatta Valley	Kiewa-Sandy Creek	Mitta United	Mitta United	Kiewa-Sandy Creek	Dederang Mt Beauty				
1981	Kiewa-Sandy Creek	Kiewa-Sandy Creek	Wodonga Demons	Kiewa-Sandy Creek	Kiewa-Sandy Creek	Yackandandah				
1982	Mitta United	Wodonga Demons	Tallangatta Valley	Kiewa-Sandy Creek	Yackandandah	Barnawartha				
1983	Kiewa-Sandy Creek	Barnwartha	AA School	Kiewa Sandy Creek	Yackandandah	Holbrook				
1984	Kiewa Sandy Creek	Wodonga Demons	AA School	Wodonga Demons	Dederang Mt. Beauty	Yackandandah				
1985	Holbrook	Mitta United	Kiewa Sandy Creek	Wodonga Demons	Dederang Mt. Beauty	Wodonga Demons				
1986	Mitta United	Mitta United	Wodonga Demons	Wodonga Demons	Culcairn	Culcairn				
1987	Wodonga Demons	Tallangatta Valley	Wodonga Demons	Culcairn	Culcairn	Dederang Mt Beauty				
1988	Mitta United	Mitta United	Wodonga Demons	Culcairn	Dederang Mt. Beauty	Holbrook				
1989	Tallangatta Valley	Yackandandah	Culcairn	Tallangatta Valley	Holbrook	Holbrook				
1990	Culcairn	Yackandandah	Culcairn	Yackandandah	Dederang Mt. Beauty	Holbrook				
1991	Holbrook	Culcairn	Culcairn	Tallangatta Valley	Bethanga	Tallangatta		Commenced in 1992	Commenced in 1992	Commenced in 1992
1992	Mitta United	Holbrook	Tallangatta Valley	Tallangatta Valley	Bethanga	Tallangatta		Yackandandah	Holbrook	Tallangatta
1993	Mitta United	Kiewa-Sandy Creek	Tallangatta Valley	Tallangatta Valley	Tallangatta	Kiewa-Sandy Creek		Dederang Mt Beauty	Thurgoona	Tallangatta
1994	Tallangatta Valley	Yackandandah	Tallangatta Valley	Tallangatta Valley	Kiewa-Sandy Creek	Kiewa-Sandy Creek		Tallangatta	Tallangatta	Kiewa-Sandy Creek
1995	Kiewa-Sandy Creek	Mitta United	Tallangatta Valley	Tallangatta Valley	Kiewa-Sandy Creek	Kiewa-Sandy Creek		Holbrook	Bethanga	Yackandandah
1996	Mitta United	Mitta United	Tallangatta Valley	Tallangatta Valley	Kiewa-Sandy Creek	Tallangatta		Tallangatta	Bethanga	Kiewa-Sandy Creek
1997	Tallangatta Valley	Mitta United	Kiewa-Sandy Creek	Thurgoona	Dederang Mt. Beauty	Tallangatta		Thurgoona	Thurgoona	Kiewa-Sandy Creek
1998	Tallangatta Valley	Barnawartha	Thurgoona	Dederang Mt. Beauty	Thurgoona	Holbrook		Yackandandah	Tallangatta	Tallangatta
1999	Dederang Mt Beauty	Dederang Mt Beauty	Thurgoona	Dederang Mt. Beauty	Yackandandah	Kiewa-Sandy Creek		Barnawartha	Kiewa Sandy Creek	Yackandandah
2000	Yackandandah	Yackandandah	Kiewa-Sandy Creek	Mitta United	Thurgoona	Yackandandah		Barnawartha	Tallangatta Valley	Kiewa-Sandy Creek
2001	Dederang-Mt. Beauty	Yackandandah	Dederang-Mt. Beauty	Mitta United	Barnawartha	Kiewa Sandy Creek		Bethanga	Mitta United	Kiewa Sandy Creek
2002	Barnawartha	Barnawartha	Barnawartha	Barnawartha	Barnawartha	Barnawartha		Kiewa-Sandy Creek	Mitta United	Kiewa-Sandy Creek
2003	Dederang-Mt. Beauty	Mitta United	Kiewa-Sandy Creek	Dederang-Mt. Beauty	Wodonga Saints	Chiltern		Wodonga Saints	Barnawartha	Wodonga Saints
2004	Mitta United	Mitta United	Barnawartha	Kiewa-Sandy Creek	Wodonga Saints	Chiltern		Mitta United	Wodonga Saints	Wodonga Saints
2005	Mitta United	Mitta United	Barnawartha	Kiewa-Sandy Creek	Yackandandah	Wodonga Saints		Kiewa-Sandy Creek	Wodonga Saints	Chiltern
2006	Mitta United	Kiewa-Sandy Creek	Kiewa-Sandy Creek	Kiewa-Sandy Creek	Yackandandah	Chiltern		Chiltern	Wodonga Saints	Thurgoona
2007	Mitta United	Kiewa-Sandy Creek	Beechworth	Rutherglen	Yackandandah	Barnawartha		Barnawartha	Thurgoona	Yackandandah
2008	Kiewa-Sandy Creek	Mitta United	Barnawartha	Beechworth	Kiewa-Sandy Creek	Yackandandah		Mitta United	Yackandandah	Rutherglen
2009	Tallangatta	Tallangatta	Wodonga Saints	Wahgunyah	Wahgunyah	Wahgunyah		Yackandandah	Wodonga Saints	Wodonga Saints
2010	Beechworth	Wahgunyah	Tallangatta	Wahgunyah	Barnawartha	Chiltern		Thurgoona	Wodonga Saints	Wodonga Saints
2011	Kiewa-Sandy Creek	Thurgoona	Kiewa-Sandy Creek	Mitta United	Mitta United	Mitta United		Wodonga Saints	Wodonga Saints	Kiewa-Sandy Creek
2012	Mitta United	Thurgoona	Wahgunyah	Wahgunyah	Barnawartha	Thurgoona	Commenced in 2013	Thurgoona	Kiewa-Sandy Creek	Barnawartha
2013	Barnawartha	Thurgoona	Mitta United	Dederang-Mt. Beauty	Thurgoona	Thurgoona	Kiewa-Sandy Creek	Thurgoona	Barnawartha	Barnawartha
2014	Kiewa-Sandy Creek	Thurgoona	Barnawartha	Thurgoona	Thurgoona	Thurgoona	Barnawartha	Kiewa-Sandy Creek	Barnawartha	Barnawartha
2015	Tallangatta	Thurgoona	Yackandandah	Thurgoona	Thurgoona	Chiltern	Barnawartha	Rutherglen	Barnawartha	Barnawartha
2016	Thurgoona	Kiewa-Sandy Creek	Yackandandah	Yackandandah	Thurgoona	Thurgoona	Barnawartha	Thurgoona	Barnawartha	Thurgoona
2017	Thurgoona	Yackandandah	Yackandandah	Beechworth	Tallangatta	Thurgoona	Thurgoona	Thurgoona	Chiltern	Wodonga Saints
2018	Kiewa-Sandy Creek	Thurgoona	Tallangatta	Wahgunyah	Tallangatta	Barnawartha	Thurgoona	Thurgoona	Thurgoona	Yackandandah
2019	Thurgoona	Yackandandah	Tallangatta	Tallangatta	Kiewa Sandy Creek	Barnawartha	Barnawartha	Thurgoona	Wodonga Saints	Yackandandah
2020	Season cancelled due to the COVID-19 pandemic									
2021	Season abandoned after 11 matches. No finals series played due to COVID-19. 2021 Minor Premiers listed below.									
	1st: Yackandandah	1st: Kiewa Sandy Creek	1st: Barnawartha	1st: Thurgoona	1st: Kiewa Sandy Creek	1st: Thurgoona	1st: Thurgoona	1st: Wodonga Saints	1st: Tallangatta	1st: Wodonga Saints
2022	Chiltern	Chiltern	Barnawartha	Chiltern	Kiewa Sandy Creek	Tallangatta	Thurgoona	Mitta United	Mitta United	Mitta United
2023	Chiltern	Chiltern	Kiewa-Sandy Creek	Dederang-Mt Beauty	Kiewa-Sandy Creek	Thurgoona	Kiewa-Sandy Creek	Barnawartha	Mitta United	Yackandandah
2024	Yackandandah	Yackandandah	Yackandandah	Yackandandah	Chiltern	Thurgoona	Thurgoona	Mitta United	Yackandandah	Wodonga Saints
2025	Kiewa Sandy Creek	Kiewa Sandy Creek	Rutherglen	Thurgoona	Henty	Kiewa Sandy Creek	Thurgoona	Jindera	Kiewa Sandy Creek	Kiewa Sandy Creek
2026										
Year	Seniors	Reserves	Thirds / U/17	Fourths / U/14	A. Grade	B. Grade	C. Grade	D. Grade / 18 & U	E. Grade / 15 & U	F. Grade / 13 & U

- note: UR=Unknown result

=== Current finals system ===
Since 1974 the TDFL has used the "McIntyre system". The final series is played over four weekends, with the grand final traditionally being played on the second weekend of September.

=== Grand Final ===
The TDFL board deems that all finals will be held at the natural venue of the Sandy Creek Recreation Reserve (Sandy Creek, Victoria), with all finals for both football and netball played at the one venue during each final day.

The Grand Final since 1971 has also been held at Sandy Creek Recreation Reserve (Sandy Creek, Victoria), commonly referred to by locals as "The MCG of the Bush" for its large playing surface and picturesque surroundings, but unfortunately the football and netball changerooms are not up to modern standards and require significant State and Local Government funding for capital improvements as soon as possible.

The last finals match held away from Sandy Creek was the "1989 second semi-final" held at Bunton Park (North Albury, New South Wales), and the last grand final match held away from Sandy Creek was the "1970 Grand Final" held at the Barnawartha Recreation Reserve (Barnawartha, Victoria).

Qualifying final
"A"	2nd on ladder	Home
3	3rd on ladder	Away
"B"	4th on ladder	Home
5	5th on ladder	Away

Major semi-final
"C"	1st on ladder	Home
Winner final "A"	Away
Minor semi-final
"D"	Loser final "A"	Home
Winner final "B"	Away

Preliminary final
"E"	Loser final "C"	Home
Winner final "D"	Away

Grand final
"F"	Winner final "C"	Home
Winner final "E"	Away

== Football Records ==
Football – Seniors: 1945 to present
- All matches
  - Highest Score: 432: Wahgunyah 0.1 (1) Def. by Beechworth 66.36 (432) at Wahgunyah (2022 Rd.5) Match Report
  - Most goals in a game: 27, Ray Mack of Holbrook (vs Thurgoona, 1992); 23, Peter Cook of Barnawartha v Wodonga Saints, Rd.7, 2011
  - Most goals in a season: 151, Peter Woodford of Barnawartha (1984)
  - Most wins in a row: –
  - Most losses in a row: 49: Wodonga Saints from 2009 Rd.2 (18 April'09) to Rd.14 (16 July'11). Defeated Tallangatta in Rd.15.
  - Youngest Senior Player: 13 years old. Harper Walker: Yackandandah. Debut Rd.16, 01/08/2026 v Wodonga Saints.
- Grand Finals
  - Most wins: 22: Mitta United
  - Most appearances: 32: Mitta United
  - Most wins in a row: 4: Mitta United (2004, 2005, 2006, 2007).
  - Most appearances in a row: 5, Mitta United (1957, 1958, 1959, 1960, 1961) & (2003, 2004, 2005, 2006, 2007).
  - Highest scoring: 1985: Holbrook 22.17 (149) def. Wodonga Demons 13.6 (84)
  - Highest margin: 85 points: 2017: Thurgoona 22.10 (142) def. Kiewa-Sandy Creek 8.9 (57)

- Football – Reserves: 1968 to present
- Football – Thirds (Under 17s): 1974 to present
- Football – Fourths (Under 14s): 1980 to present

== Club Championships ==
Club Championship: 2010 to present
- 2010: Thurgoona.
- 2011: Thurgoona.
- 2012: Thurgoona.
- 2013: Thurgoona - 848 points.
- 2014: Thurgoona - 768 points.
- 2015: Thurgoona.
- 2016: Thurgoona.
- 2017: Thurgoona - 897 points.
- 2018:
- 2019:
- 2020: T&DFL in recess > COVID-19
- 2021:
- 2022:
- 2023:
- 2024: Kiewa Sandy Creek - 784 points.
- 2025:

== Tallangatta District Netball Association – Grand Finals ==
=== A. Grade ===
Tallangatta District Netball Association – A. GRADE Grand Finals Results
Year	Premiers	Score	Runners up	Score	Venue	Best on Court	Comments
					Sandy Creek		
1980	Kiewa Sandy Creek				Sandy Creek		
1981	Kiewa Sandy Creek				Sandy Creek		
1982	Yackandandah				Sandy Creek		
1983	Yackandandah				Sandy Creek		
1984	Dederang Mt Beauty				Sandy Creek		
1985	Dederang Mt Beauty				Sandy Creek		
1986	Culcairn				Sandy Creek		
1987	Culcairn				Sandy Creek		
1988	Dederang Mt Beauty				Sandy Creek		
1989	Holbrook				Sandy Creek		
1990	Dederang Mt Beauty				Sandy Creek		
1991	Bethanga				Sandy Creek		
1992	Bethanga				Sandy Creek		
1993	Tallangatta				Sandy Creek		
1994	Kiewa Sandy Creek				Sandy Creek		
1995	Kiewa Sandy Creek				Sandy Creek		
1996	Kiewa Sandy Creek				Sandy Creek		
1997	Dederang Mt Beauty				Sandy Creek		
1998	Thurgoona				Sandy Creek		
1999	Yackandandah				Sandy Creek		
2000	Thurgoona				Sandy Creek		
2001	Barnawartha				Sandy Creek		
2002	Barnawartha				Sandy Creek		
2003	Wodonga Saints				Sandy Creek		
2004	Wodonga Saints				Sandy Creek		
2005	Yackandandah				Sandy Creek		
2006	Yackandandah				Sandy Creek		
2007	Yackandandah				Sandy Creek		
2008	Kiewa Sandy Creek				Sandy Creek		
2009	Wahgunyah				Sandy Creek		
2010	Barnawartha				Sandy Creek		
2011	Barnawartha				Sandy Creek		
2012	Barnawartha				Sandy Creek		
2013	Thurgoona				Sandy Creek		
2014	Thurgoona	51	Barnwartha	50	Sandy Creek		
2015	Thurgoona	44	Chiltern	32	Sandy Creek		
2016	Thurgoona	48	Waygunyah	33	Sandy Creek		
2017	Tallangatta	48	Thurgoona	33	Sandy Creek		
2018	Tallangatta	36	Kiewa Sandy Creek	36	Sandy Creek		Drawn Grand Final
	Tallangatta	48	Kiewa Sandy Creek	43	Sandy Creek	Emily Rodd	Extra Time
2019	Kiewa Sandy Creek	32	Thurgoona	28	Sandy Creek		
2020	TDNA in recess >		COVID-19				
2021	1st: Kiewa Sandy Creek		2nd: Tallangatta			COVID-19 >	No finals series
2022	Kiewa Sandy Creek	44	Mitta United	23	Sandy Creek	Georgie Attrie (KSC)	
2023	Kiewa Sandy Creek	41	Yackandandah	37	Sandy Creek	Rebecca O'Connell (Y)	
2024	Chiltern	35	Kiewa Sandy Creek	33	Sandy Creek	Georgia Thomas	
2025	Chiltern	39	Kiewa Sandy Creek	32	Sandy Creek	Jess Tolley	
2026	Kiewa Sandy Creek	44	Chiltern	36	Sandy Creek	Kate Worsteling (KSC)	
2027					Sandy Creek		
Year	Premiers	Score	Runners up	Score	Venue	Best on Court	Comments

=== B. Grade ===
Tallangatta District Netball Association – B. GRADE Grand Finals Results
Year	Premiers	Score	Runners up	Score	Venue	Best on Court	Comments
1980	Dederang Mt Beauty				Sandy Creek		
1981	Yackandandah				Sandy Creek		
1982	Barnawartha				Sandy Creek		
1983	Holbrook				Sandy Creek		
1984	Yackandandah				Sandy Creek		
1985	Wodonga Demons				Sandy Creek		
1986	Culcairn				Sandy Creek		
1987	Dederang Mt Beauty				Sandy Creek		
1988	Holbrook				Sandy Creek		
1989	Holbrook				Sandy Creek		
1990	Holbrook				Sandy Creek		
1991	Tallangatta				Sandy Creek		
1992	Tallangatta				Sandy Creek		
1993	Kiewa Sandy Creek				Sandy Creek		
1994	Kiewa Sandy Creek				Sandy Creek		
1995	Kiewa Sandy Creek				Sandy Creek		
1996	Tallangatta				Sandy Creek		
1997	Tallangatta				Sandy Creek		
1998	Holbrook				Sandy Creek		
1999	Kiewa Sandy Creek				Sandy Creek		
2000	Yackandandah				Sandy Creek		
2001	Kiewa Sandy Creek				Sandy Creek		
2002	Barnawartha				Sandy Creek		
2003	Chiltern				Sandy Creek		
2004	Chiltern				Sandy Creek		
2005	Wodonga Saints				Sandy Creek		
2006	Chiltern				Sandy Creek		
2007	Barnawartha				Sandy Creek		
2008	Yackandandah				Sandy Creek		
2009	Wahgunyah				Sandy Creek		
2010	Chiltern				Sandy Creek		
2011	Mitta United				Sandy Creek		
2012	Thurgoona				Sandy Creek		
2013	Thurgoona				Sandy Creek		
2014	Thurgoona	51	Barnawartha	50	Sandy Creek		
2015	Chiltern	44	Chiltern	32	Sandy Creek		
2016	Thurgoona	34	Chiltern	33	Sandy Creek		
2017	Thurgoona	55	Barnwartha	36	Sandy Creek		
2018	Barnawartha	41	Thurgoona	38	Sandy Creek	Talia Peterson (B)	
2019	Barnawartha	43	Thurgoona	24	Sandy Creek		
2020	TDNA in recess >		COVID-19				
2021	1st: Thurgoona		2nd: Mitta United		Sandy Creek		No finals series
2022	Tallangatta	37	Mitta United	35	Sandy Creek	Renee Page (T)	
2023	Thurgoona	39	Tallangatta	38	Sandy Creek	Amy Rixon (T)	
2024	Thurgoona	34	Mitta United	33	Sandy Creek	Kim Murphy	
2025	Kiewa Sandy Creek	41	Thurgoona	35	Sandy Creek	Amy Kindellan	
2026	Thurgoona	46	Kiewa Sandy Creek	45	Sandy Creek	Alana Northey	
2026							
Year	Premiers	Score	Runners up	Score	Venue	Best on Court	Comments

=== C. Grade ===
Tallangatta District Netball Association – C. GRADE Grand Finals Results
Year	Premiers	Score	Runners up	Score	Venue	Best on Court	Comments
2013	Kiewa Sandy Creek				Sandy Creek		
2014	Barnawartha	44	Thurgoona	37	Sandy Creek		
2015	Barnawartha	52	Kiewa Sandy Creek	25	Sandy Creek		
2016	Barnawartha	51	Thurgoona	37	Sandy Creek		
2017	Thurgoona	45	Chiltern	28	Sandy Creek		
2018	Thurgoona	42	Rutherglen	38	Sandy Creek	Kami-Lee Kimball (T)	
2019	Barnawartha	48	Rutherglen	44	Sandy Creek		
2020	TDNA in recess >		COVID-19				
2021	1st: Thurgoona		2nd: Tallangatta				No finals series
2022	Thurgoona	44	Kiewa Sandy Creek	29	Sandy Creek	Chloe Kluver (T)	
2023	Kiewa-Sandy Creek	40	Thurgoona	39	Sandy Creek	Lisa McInerney (KSC)	
2024	Thurgoona	48	Kiewa Sandy Creek	37	Sandy Creek	Lucy-Jane Guerin	
2025	Thurgoona	50	Chiltern	41	Sandy Creek	Grace Armstrong (T)	
2026	Kiewa Sandy Creek	40	Thurgoona	37	Sandy Creek	Lisa McInerney (KSC)	
2027					Sandy Creek		
Year	Premiers	Score	Runners up	Score	Venue	Best on Court	Comments

=== C. Reserve ===
Tallangatta District Netball Association – C. RESERVE 2025 Onwards Grand Finals Results
Year	Premiers	Score	Runners up	Score	Venue	Best on Court	Comments
					Sandy Creek		
2025	Thurgoona	33	Kiewa Sandy Creek	31	Sandy Creek	Mia Sanday	
2026	Chiltern	31	Kiewa Sandy Creek	28	Sandy Creek	Emily Phibbs (C)	
2027					Sandy Creek		
Year	Premiers	Score	Runners up	Score	Venue	Best on Court	Comments

=== 18 & Under ===
Tallangatta District Netball Association – 18 & UNDER Grand Finals Results
Year	Premiers	Score	Runners up	Score	Best on Court	Venue	Comments
1992	Yackandandah					Sandy Creek	
1993	Dederang Mt Beauty					Sandy Creek	
1994	Tallangatta					Sandy Creek	
1995	Holbrook					Sandy Creek	
1996	Tallangatta					Sandy Creek	
1997	Thurgoona					Sandy Creek	
1998	Yackandandah					Sandy Creek	
1999	Barnawartha					Sandy Creek	
2000	Barnawartha					Sandy Creek	
2001	Bethanga					Sandy Creek	
2002	Kiewa Sandy Creek					Sandy Creek	
2003	Wodonga Saints					Sandy Creek	
2004	Mitta United					Sandy Creek	
2005	Kiewa Sandy Creek					Sandy Creek	
2006	Chiltern					Sandy Creek	
2007	Barnawartha					Sandy Creek	
2008	Mitta United					Sandy Creek	
2009	Yackandandah					Sandy Creek	
2010	Thurgoona					Sandy Creek	
2011	Wodonga Saints					Sandy Creek	
2012	Thurgoona					Sandy Creek	
2013	Thurgoona					Sandy Creek	
2014	Kiewa Sandy Creek	47	Barnawartha	19		Sandy Creek	
2015	Rutherglen	35	Thurgoona	30		Sandy Creek	
2016	Thurgoona	52	Wahgunyah	28		Sandy Creek	
2017	Thurgoona	40	Wahgunyah	34		Sandy Creek	
2018	Thurgoona	48	Chiltern	36	Caitlin Wilson (T)	Sandy Creek	
2019	Thurgoona	39	Barnwartha	33		Sandy Creek	
2020	TDNA in recess >		COVID-19				
2021	1st: Wodonga Saints		2nd: Barnawartha				No finals series
2022	Mitta United	46	Barnawartha	30	Tarli Kennett (MU)	Sandy Creek	
2023	Barnwartha	41	Chiltern	32	? (B)	Sandy Creek	
2024	Mitta United	41	Kiewa Sandy Creek	35	Chelsea Harding	Sandy Creek	
2025	Kiewa Sandy Creek	42	Chiltern	38	Charlee Bradsworth (KSC)	Sandy Creek	
2026	Chiltern	32	Tallangatta	27	Pyper Curphey (T)	Sandy Creek	
2027						Sandy Creek	
Year	Premiers	Score	Runners up	Score	Best on Court	Venue	Comments

=== 15 & Under ===
Tallangatta District Netball Association – 15 & UNDER Grand Finals Results
Year	Premiers	Score	Runners up	Score	Best on Court	Venue	Comments
						Sandy Creek	
1992	Holbrook					Sandy Creek	
1993	Thurgoona					Sandy Creek	
1994	Tallangatta					Sandy Creek	
1995	Bethanga					Sandy Creek	
1996	Bethanga					Sandy Creek	
1997	Thurgoona					Sandy Creek	
1998	Tallangatta					Sandy Creek	
1999	Kiewa Sandy Creek					Sandy Creek	
2000	Tallangatta					Sandy Creek	
2001	Mitta United					Sandy Creek	
2002	Mitta United					Sandy Creek	
2003	Barnawartha					Sandy Creek	
2004	Wodonga Saints					Sandy Creek	
2005	Wodonga Saints					Sandy Creek	
2006	Wodonga Saints					Sandy Creek	
2007	Thurgoona					Sandy Creek	
2008	Yackandandah					Sandy Creek	
2009	Wodonga Saints					Sandy Creek	
2010	Wodonga Saints					Sandy Creek	
2011	Wodonga Saints					Sandy Creek	
2012	Kiewa Sandy Creek					Sandy Creek	
2013	Barnawartha					Sandy Creek	
2014	Barnawartha					Sandy Creek	
2015	Barnawartha					Sandy Creek	
2016	Barnawartha					Sandy Creek	
2017	Chiltern					Sandy Creek	
2018	Thurgoona					Sandy Creek	
2019	Wodonga Saints					Sandy Creek	
2020	TDNA in recess >		COVID-19			Sandy Creek	
2021	1st: Tallangatta					Sandy Creek	No finals series
2022	Mitta United	41	Wodonga Saints	34	Zoe Dunn (MU)	Sandy Creek	
2023	Mitta United	47	Yackandandah	23	Bella Bowles (MU)	Sandy Creek	
2024	Yackandandah	51	Tallangatta	49	Emerson O'Neill (Y)	Sandy Creek	
2025	Kiewa Sandy Creek	30	Chiltern	28	Katie Stewart (C)	Sandy Creek	
2026	Thurgoona	44	Chiltern	41	Lucia Wall (T)	Sandy Creek	
2027						Sandy Creek	

=== 13 & Under ===
Tallangatta District Netball Association – 13 & UNDER Grand Finals Results
Year	Premiers	Score	Runners up	Score	Best on Court	Venue	Comments
						Sandy Creek	
1992	Tallangatta					Sandy Creek	
1993	Tallangatta					Sandy Creek	
1994	Kiewa Sandy Creek					Sandy Creek	
1995	Yackandandah					Sandy Creek	
1996	Kiewa Sandy Creek					Sandy Creek	
1997	Kiewa Sandy Creek					Sandy Creek	
1998	Tallangatta					Sandy Creek	
1999	Yackandandah					Sandy Creek	
2000	Kiewa Sandy Creek					Sandy Creek	
2001	Kiewa Sandy Creek					Sandy Creek	
2002	Kiewa Sandy Creek					Sandy Creek	
2003	Wodonga Saints					Sandy Creek	
2004	Wodonga Saints					Sandy Creek	
2005	Chiltern					Sandy Creek	
2006	Thurgoona					Sandy Creek	
2007	Yackandandah					Sandy Creek	
2008	Rutherglen					Sandy Creek	
2009	Wodonga Saints					Sandy Creek	
2010	Wodonga Saints					Sandy Creek	
2011	Kiewa Sandy Creek					Sandy Creek	
2012	Barnawartha					Sandy Creek	
2013	Barnawartha					Sandy Creek	
2014	Barnawartha					Sandy Creek	
2015	Barnawartha					Sandy Creek	
2016	Thurgoona					Sandy Creek	
2017	Wodonga Saints					Sandy Creek	
2018	Yackandandah					Sandy Creek	
2019	Yackandandah					Sandy Creek	
2020	TDNA in recess >		COVID-19				
2021	1st: Wodonga Saints		Season abandoned		after Rd.11	No finals series	
2022	Mitta United	32	Barnawartha	26	Arnie Cohen (MU)	Sandy Creek	
2023	Yackandandah	34	Tallangatta	20	Emerson O'Neill (Y)	Sandy Creek	
2024	Wodonga Saints	29	Kiewa Sandy Creek	23	Bella Hamilton (KSC)	Sandy Creek	
2025	Kiewa Sandy Creek	26	Thurgoona	23	Luca Chaplin (KSC)	Sandy Creek	
2026	Thurgoona	31	Tallangatta	27	Halle McGlynn (T)	Sandy Creek	
2027						Sandy Creek	

== Tallangatta District Netball Association – Best & Fairest Awards ==
TDNA – Netball Best & Fairest Winners List

- Who won the 1990 TDNA – A. Grade Best and Fairest Award?

TDNA	A. Grade	TDNA	B. Grade	TDNA	C. Grade	TDNA	C. Reserve Grade	TDNA
Year	Commenced 1980	Netball Club	Commenced 1980	Netball Club	Commenced 2013	Netball Club	Commenced 2025	Netball Club
1980	S Watson &	Kiewa Sandy Creek	M McLinden	Barnawartha				
	C Manison	Yackandandah						
1981	C Manison	Yackandandah	T Strauss	Bethanga				
1982	M Curtis	Holbrook	J Barton	Tallangatta Valley				
1983	L Panosh	Bethanga	L Andrew	Kiewa Sandy Creek				
1984	E McIntyre &	Yackandandah	D Elliott	Kiewa Sandy Creek				
	L Brand	Culcairn						
1985	L Way	Holbrook	L Wornes	Holbrook				
1986	M Kelley	Yackandandah	L Wornes	Holbrook				
1987	L Gehrig	Barnawartha	J Moore	Yackandandah				
1988	L Brand	Culcairn	C Gosvenor	Yackandandah				
1989	D Larkin	Dederang Mt Beauty	C Gosvenor	Yackandandah				
1990	?		K Ried	Tallangatta Valley				
1991	L Hodgkin	Mitta United	R Sheather	Culcairn				
1992	J Thompson	Kiewa Sandy Creek	J Rowland	Yackandandah				
1993	J Hillier	Kiewa Sandy Creek	S McKenzie	Holbrook				
1994	M Adams	Kiewa Sandy Creek	M Wood	Thurgoona				
1995	A Thomas	Thurgoona	C Crichton	Barnwartha				
1996	J Potter	Kiewa Sandy Creek	B Gibson	Dederang Mt Beauty				
1997	Cate Crisp	Dederang Mt Beauty	L Whitley	Holbrook				
1998	M Adams	Kiewa Sandy Creek	S Adams &	Kiewa Sandy Creek				
			E Grealy &	Dederang Mt Beauty				
			T Heather	Holbrook				
1999	Cate Crisp	Dederang Mt Beauty	G Harris	Yackandandah				
2000	K Parkhouse	Thurgoona	C Moyle	Tallangatta Valley				
2001	A Gardner	Bethanga	M Cooper	Kiewa Sandy Creek				
2002	J Hogan	Barnawartha	B Bowditch	Dederang Mt Beauty				
2003	K Stephens	Mitta United	R Turner	Mitta United				
2004	R Pearce	Wodonga Saints	N Wickham	Mitta United				
2005	J Withers	Barnawartha	K Phibbs &	Chiltern				
			J Scheetz	Wodonga Saints				
2006	Rebecca Stamp	Yackandandah	R Reiners	Mitta United				
2007	K Hallawell &	Kiewa Sandy Creek	L Hallawell &	Kiewa Sandy Creek				
	C Megarrity	Rutherglen	M Carkeek &	Kiewa Sandy Creek				
			Liz McKinley &	Wodonga Saints				
			S Shannon	Chiltern				
2008	Rebecca Duryea	Wahgunyah	K Morley	Wahgunyah				
2009	Rebecca Stamp	Yackandandah	S Alderman	Kiewa Sandy Creek				
2010	C Hall	Rutherglen	K Stephens	Chiltern				
2011	Rebecca Stamp	Yackandandah	D McDonald	Kiewa Sandy Creek				
2012	Rebecca Stamp	Yackandandah	B Bowditch	Dederang Mt Beauty				
2013	G Meunier	Barnawartha	R Manzie	Wodonga Saints	J McKenzie	Thurgoona		
2014	E Johnson	Yackandandah	S Weston	Thurgoona	J House	Barnawartha		
2015	J Vine	Thurgoona	J Beer	Yackandandah	J House	Barnawartha		
2016	S Suttcliffe	Thurgoona	M Tschirpig	Thurgoona	T Howard	Thurgoona		
2017	Emma Witham	Wahgunyah	Janine Ramage	Barnawartha	Kristin McKimmie	Tallangatta		
2018	K Baude	Mitta United	P Sanderson	Chiltern	K Kimball	Thurgoona		
2019	E Browne	Rutherglen	A Groat	Kiewa Sandy Creek	H Thompson	Rutherglen		
2020	TDNA	in recess >	COVID-19					
2021	Rebecca O'Connell	Yackandandah	T Cunningham	Wahgunyah	K Borchert	Thurgoona		
2022	Rebecca O'Connell	Yackandandah	J Beer &	Yackandandah	G Berto	Wodonga Saints		
			T Pateron	Barnawartha				
2023	Alissa Donaldson (34)	Kiewa Sandy Creek	Gabby Robinson (34)	Kiewa Sandy Creek	Petrina Sanderson (32)	Chiltern		
2024	Morgan McRae	Wahgunyah	Brittney Deegan	Barnawartha	Rachel Crawford	Rutherglen		
2025	Ella Vandermeer (34)	Chiltern	Chloe Romans (35)	Dederang Mt Beauty	Jazlyn Hall (20)	Wahgunyah	Vanessa Brennan (28)	Mitta United
2026	Ella Vandermeer (31)	Chiltern	Amy Kindellan (31)	Kiewa Sandy Creek	Jen Feltrin (26)	Wodonga Saints	Stevie Fellows (20) &	Yackandnadah
							Mia Sanday (20)	Kiewa Sandy Creek
Year	A. Grade	Club	B. Grade	Club	C. Grade	Club	C. Reserve Grade	Club

TDNA – Netball Best & Fairest Winners List

TDNA	D. Grade / 18 & U	Club	E. Grade / 15 & U	Club	F. Grade / 13 & U	Club
Year	Commenced 1992		Commenced 1992		Commenced 1992	
1992	K Dryden	Yackandandah	B Gibson	Dederang Mt Beauty	K Weston	Holbrook
1993	L Bailey	Kiewa Sandy Creek	D Gray	Thurgoona	J Hanson	?
			L Birthisel	Tallangatta Valley		
1994	B Gibson	Dederang Mt Beauty	J Britton	Yackandandah	D Burt	Tallangatta Valley
1995	M Kerr	Kiewa Sandy Creek	J Britton	Yackandandah	T Heather	Holbrook
1996	A McKenzie	Holbrook	L Kermond	Yackandandah	R Brown	Mitta United
1997	K Bormann	Dederang Mt Beauty	L Wapling	Yackandandah	L Thorton	Tallangatta Valley
1998	B Jones	Barnawartha	L Melbourne	Thurgoona	L Thorton	Tallangatta Valley
1999	C Lyon &	Tallangatta Valley	J Hall	Thurgoona	T Matherson	Yackandandah
	M McMahon &	Kiewa Sandy Creek				
	S Watson	Kiewa Sandy Creek				
2000	C Mossop	Barnawartha	G Madden	Kiewa Sandy Creek	L Peters	Mitta United
2001	L Welsh &	Barnawartha	S Hodgkin	Mitta United	L Peters	Mitta United
	E Merkel	Bethanga				
2002	M Cochrane	Kiewa Sandy Creek	L Peters	Mitta United	J Barr	Kiewa Sandy Creek
2003	E Merkel	Wodonga Saints	C Schulz	Barnawartha	E Wortman	Wodonga Saints
2004	L Peters	Mitta United	J Dean	Barnawartha	A Kemp	Kiewa Sandy Creek
2005	L Peters	Mitta United	E Wortmann	Wodonga Saints	A Wortman	Wodonga Saints
2006	B Hutchings	Yackandandah	S Thomas	Tallangatta Valley	B Boyd	Thurgoona
2007	B Hutchings	Yackandandah	P Hearps	Kiewa Sandy Creek	M Quinn	Tallangatta
2008	G Miller	Mitta United	C Harrison &	Barnawartha	E Carkeek	Kiewa Sandy Creek
			C Greene	Yackandandah		
2009	A Van Der Ven	Dederang Mt Beauty	B Aumont	Kiewa Sandy Creek	G Stewart	Rutherglen
2010	M Keljin	Rutherglen	A O'Connell	Wodonga Saints	J Newton	Wodonga Saints
2011	E Ley	Mitta United	J Newton	Wodonga Saints	T Chambeyron	Beechworth
2012	B Morley	Wahgunyah	B Deegan	Rutherglen	K Martin	Dederang Mt Beauty
					E Morrison	Beechworth
2013	B Morley	Wahgunyah	E Webb	Thurgoona	G Thomas	Chiltern
2014	K Guy	Barnawartha	G Thomas	Chiltern	M House	Barnawartha
2015	M Phibbs	Chiltern	C Butters	Barnawartha	M Duryea	Barnawartha
2016	L Crawford	Wahgunyah	S Knight	Wodonga Saints	Ella Vandermeer	Chiltern
2017	Julia Farrah	Thurgoona	A Kennett	Mitta United	Ella Vandermeer	Chiltern
2018	Z Elliott	Chiltern	K Willis	Wodonga Saints	T Dickins	Wahgunyah
2019	C Romans &	Dederang Mt Beauty	B White	Wodonga Saints	E Murphy	Yackandandah
	G Watson-Long	Rutherglen				
2020	TDNA	in recess >	COVID-19			
2021	B White	Wodonga Saints	L McKimmie	Tallangatta	E Roche	Barnawartha
2022	T Kennett	Mitta United	E Roche	Barnawartha	A Cohen	Mitta United
2023	Kate Pritchard (37)	Chiltern	Tully Proctor (31)	Thurgoona	Ciara Bennett (32)	Wahgunyah
2024	Bella Bowles	Thurgoona	Bridie Evans	Barnawartha	Hayley Way	Thurgoona
2025	Kate Bird (37)	Kiewa Sandy Creek	Ciara Bennett (30) &	Wahgunyah	Jaz Heffernan (27)	Kiewa Sandy Creek
			Indi Benson (30)	Kiewa Sandy Creek		
2026	Sophie Mason (?)	Tallangatta	Tahlia Jarrett (39)	Chiltern	Layla Cox (32)	Mitta United
2027						
Year	D. Grade / 18 & Under (votes)	Club	E. Grade / 15 & Under	Club	F. Grade / 13 & Under	Club

== Netball Grades ==
- Netball – A Grade: 1980 to present
- Netball – B Grade: 1980 to present
- Netball – C Grade: 2013 to present
- Netball – C. Reserve Grade: 2025 to present
- Netball – D Grade (18 & Under): 1992 to present
- Netball – E Grade (15 & Under): 1992 to present
- Netball – F Grade (13 & Under): 1992 to present

== Seasons ==
- 1945: TDFL Senior Grade competition starts.
- 1968: TDFL Reserve Grade competition starts. (Lavington defeat Tallangatta to become the Leagues first Reserve Grade Premiers)
- 1974: TDFL Thirds competition begins.
- 1980: TDFL Fourths competition begins. TDNA established with TDNA – A. Grade & TDNA – B. Grade competitions begin.
- 1992: TDNA – D. Grade (18 & Under), TDNA – E. Grade (15 & Under) & TDNA – F. Grade (13 & Under) competitions begin.
- 2013: TDNA – C. Grade competition begins.

=== 2000–2009 ===
==== 2005 season ====
Tallangatta DFL	Wins	Byes	Losses	Draws	For	Against	%	Pts	Final	Team	G	B	Pts	Team	G	B	Pts
Mitta United	14	2	2	0	2146	946	226.85%	64	Elimination	Rutherglen	15	18	108	Barnawartha	10	9	69
Chiltern	12	2	4	0	1814	1057	171.62%	56	Qualifying	Chiltern	16	7	103	Dederang Mt Beauty	10	18	78
Dederang Mt Beauty	12	2	4	0	1788	1082	165.25%	56	1st semi	Dederang Mt Beauty	14	13	97	Rutherglen	11	16	82
Rutherglen	11	2	5	0	1700	1268	134.07%	52	2nd semi	Mitta United	19	13	127	Chiltern	9	6	60
Barnawartha	9	2	7	0	1560	1456	107.14%	44	Preliminary	Chiltern	14	12	96	Dederang Mt Beauty	19	13	127
Kiewa Sandy Creek	8	2	8	0	1512	1193	126.74%	40	Grand	Mitta United	11	15	81	Dederang Mt Beauty	6	8	44
Tallangatta Valley	7	2	9	0	1362	1286	105.91%	36									
Beechworth	5	2	10	1	1145	1478	77.47%	30									
Wodonga Saints	5	2	10	1	963	1608	59.89%	30									
Yackandandah	4	2	12	0	1376	1493	92.16%	24									
Thurgoona	0	2	16	0	575	3074	18.71%	8									

==== 2006 season ====
Tallangatta DFL	Wins	Byes	Losses	Draws	For	Against	%	Pts	Final	Team	G	B	Pts	Team	G	B	Pts
Chiltern	14	2	2	0	1654	952	173.74%	64	Elimination	Dederang Mt Beauty	14	9	93	Rutherglen	12	18	90
Mitta United	13	2	3	0	1630	1225	133.06%	60	Qualifying	Mitta United	11	9	75	Yackandandah	8	9	57
Yackandandah	12	2	4	0	1623	1187	136.73%	56	1st semi	Dederang Mt Beauty	19	14	128	Yackandandah	13	13	91
Rutherglen	11	2	5	0	1589	1341	118.49%	52	2nd semi	Mitta United	19	11	125	Chiltern	13	9	87
Dederang Mt Beauty	9	2	7	0	1644	1294	127.05%	44	Preliminary	Chiltern	18	18	126	Dederang Mt Beauty	13	12	90
Beechworth	9	2	7	0	1404	1326	105.88%	44	Grand	Mitta United	9	5	59	Chiltern	7	8	50
Barnawartha	6	2	9	0	1526	1501	101.67%	32									
Kiewa Sandy Creek	6	2	9	0	1352	1425	94.88%	32									
Tallangatta Valley	4	2	12	0	1139	1759	64.75%	24									
Thurgoona	2	2	14	0	1097	1867	58.76%	16									
Wodonga Saints	1	2	15	0	1078	1859	57.99%	12									

==== 2007 season ====
Tallangatta DFL	Wins	Byes	Losses	Draws	For	Against	%	Pts	Final	Team	G	B	Pts	Team	G	B	Pts
Mitta United	14	2	2	0	1587	838	189.38%	64	Elimination	Thurgoona	12	9	81	Chiltern	6	6	42
Kiewa Sandy Creek	13	2	3	0	1661	768	216.28%	60	Qualifying	Kiewa Sandy Creek	17	10	112	Barnawartha	12	11	83
Barnawartha	13	2	3	0	1425	978	145.71%	60	1st semi	Barnawartha	15	14	104	Thurgoona	10	9	69
Thurgoona	13	2	3	0	1434	1137	126.12%	60	2nd semi	Kiewa Sandy Creek	14	15	99	Mitta United	9	11	65
Chiltern	9	2	7	0	1246	1046	119.12%	44	Preliminary	Mitta United	17	8	110	Barnawartha	10	7	67
Beechworth	8	2	8	0	1260	1360	92.65%	40	Grand	Mitta United	8	7	55	Kiewa Sandy Creek	7	12	54
Yackandandah	6	2	10	0	1053	1273	82.72%	32									
Dederang Mt Beauty	6	2	10	0	1089	1318	82.63%	32									
Wodonga Saints	3	2	13	0	905	1521	59.50%	20									
Rutherglen	2	2	14	0	937	1725	54.32%	16									
Tallangatta Valley	1	2	15	0	869	1502	57.86%	12									

==== 2008 season ====
Tallangatta DFL	Wins	Byes	Losses	Draws	For	Against	%	Pts	Final	Team	G	B	Pts	Team	G	B	Pts
Kiewa Sandy Creek	16	0	2	0	2082	1132	183.92%	64	Elimination	Barnawartha	19	9	123	Tallangatta Valley	9	10	64
Mitta United	15	0	2	1	1840	1170	157.26%	62	Qualifying	Mitta United	10	12	72	Dederang Mt Beauty	8	9	57
Dederang Mt Beauty	13	0	5	0	1666	1219	136.67%	52	1st semi	Dederang Mt Beauty	9	13	67	Barnawartha	7	7	49
Tallangatta Valley	11	0	7	0	1531	1231	124.37%	44	2nd semi	Kiewa Sandy Creek	20	15	135	Mitta United	8	7	55
Barnawartha	11	0	7	0	1695	1384	122.47%	44	Preliminary	Dederang Mt Beauty	17	6	108	Mitta United	10	19	79
Chiltern	10	0	8	0	1273	1430	89.02%	40	Grand	Kiewa Sandy Creek	14	28	112	Dederang Mt Beauty	11	12	78
Beechworth	9	0	8	1	1443	1374	105.02%	38									
Yackandandah	9	0	9	0	1372	1574	87.17%	36									
Thurgoona	5	0	13	0	1408	1630	86.38%	20									
Wahgunyah	5	0	13	0	1288	1511	85.24%	20									
Rutherglen	2	0	16	0	1008	1851	54.46%	8									
Wodonga Saints	1	0	17	0	864	1964	43.99%	4									

==== 2009 season ====
Tallangatta DFL	Wins	Byes	Losses	Draws	For	Against	%	Pts	Final	Team	G	B	Pts	Team	G	B	Pts
Kiewa Sandy Creek	16	0	2	0	2267	1013	223.79%	64	Elimination	Yackandandah	8	19	67	Thurgoona	8	8	56
Tallangatta Valley	16	0	2	0	2263	1165	194.25%	64	Qualifying	Tallangatta Valley	17	13	115	Beechworth	12	9	81
Beechworth	15	0	3	0	2171	1085	200.09%	60	1st semi	Beechworth	10	15	75	Yackandandah	7	11	53
Yackandandah	13	0	5	0	1791	1277	140.25%	52	2nd semi	Tallangatta Valley	10	6	66	Kiewa Sandy Creek	7	11	53
Thurgoona	11	0	7	0	1889	1267	149.09%	44	Preliminary	Beechworth	18	7	115	Kiewa Sandy Creek	12	10	82
Mitta United	11	0	7	0	1562	1689	92.48%	44	Grand	Tallangatta Valley	13	10	88	Beechworth	8	15	63
Barnawartha	8	0	10	0	1504	1686	89.21%	32									
Rutherglen	7	0	11	0	1356	1479	91.68%	28									
Wahgunyah	5	0	13	0	1394	1731	80.53%	20									
Dederang Mt Beauty	4	0	14	0	1272	2027	62.75%	16									
Wodonga Saints	1	0	17	0	975	2250	43.33%	4									
Chiltern	1	0	17	0	760	2535	29.98%	4									

=== 2010–2019 ===
==== 2010 season ====
Tallangatta DFL	Wins	Byes	Losses	Draws	For	Against	%	Pts	Final	Team	G	B	Pts	Team	G	B	Pts
Beechworth	15	0	3	0	1759	1102	159.62%	60	Elimination	Rutherglen	11	15	81	Kiewa Sandy Creek	11	5	71
Yackandandah	13	0	5	0	1509	1100	137.18%	52	Qualifying	Thurgoona	18	7	115	Yackandandah	11	16	82
Thurgoona	13	0	5	0	1971	1550	127.16%	52	1st semi	Yackandandah	18	10	118	Rutherglen	7	7	49
Rutherglen	12	0	6	0	1639	1177	139.25%	48	2nd semi	Beechworth	15	11	101	Thurgoona	8	8	56
Kiewa Sandy Creek	10	0	7	1	1596	1257	126.97%	42	Preliminary	Yackandandah	2	13	25	Thurgoona	2	10	22
Mitta United	10	0	8	0	1583	1431	110.62%	40	Grand	Beechworth	18	9	117	Yackandandah	12	5	77
Tallangatta Valley	9	0	9	0	1533	1426	107.50%	36									
Barnawartha	8	0	10	0	1707	1489	114.64%	32									
Chiltern	6	0	11	1	1298	1353	95.93%	26									
Dederang Mt Beauty	6	0	12	0	1270	1522	83.44%	24									
Wahgunyah	5	0	13	0	1484	1537	96.55%	20									
Wodonga Saints	0	0	18	0	631	3036	20.78%	0									

==== 2011 season ====
Tallangatta DFL	Wins	Byes	Losses	Draws	For	Against	%	Pts	Final	Team	G	B	Pts	Team	G	B	Pts
Thurgoona	16	0	2	0	2210	1155	191.34%	64	Elimination	Kiewa Sandy Creek	13	15	93	Barnawartha	14	5	89
Mitta United	15	0	3	0	1993	1329	149.96%	60	Qualifying	Mitta United	9	10	64	Wahgunyah	9	6	60
Wahgunyah	13	0	5	0	2036	1076	189.22%	52	1st semi	Kiewa Sandy Creek	18	13	121	Wahgunyah	15	6	96
Barnawartha	13	0	5	0	2190	1239	176.76%	52	2nd semi	Thurgoona	21	12	138	Mitta United	11	7	73
Kiewa Sandy Creek	13	0	5	0	2121	1240	171.05%	52	Preliminary	Kiewa Sandy Creek	20	10	130	Mitta United	11	9	75
Rutherglen	9	0	9	0	1559	1407	110.80%	36	Grand	Kiewa Sandy Creek	15	6	96	Thurgoona	11	6	72
Beechworth	8	0	10	0	1632	1485	109.90%	32									
Dederang Mt Beauty	7	0	11	0	1616	1644	98.30%	28									
Yackandandah	6	0	12	0	1339	1881	71.19%	24									
Chiltern	4	0	14	0	1390	1846	75.30%	16									
Tallangatta Valley	3	0	15	0	1244	1850	67.24%	12									
Wodonga Saints	1	0	17	0	445	3623	12.28%	4									

==== 2012 season ====
Tallangatta DFL	Wins	Byes	Losses	Draws	For	Against	%	Pts	Final	Team	G	B	Pts	Team	G	B	Pts
Kiewa Sandy Creek	15	0	3	0	2132	1092	195.24%	60	Elimination	Chiltern	16	6	102	Barnawartha	18	19	127
Mitta United	15	0	3	0	2071	1132	182.95%	60	Qualifying	Mitta United	7	13	55	Thurgoona	7	7	49
Thurgoona	15	0	3	0	2091	1202	173.96%	60	1st semi	Thurgoona	16	11	107	Barnawartha	13	8	86
Chiltern	13	0	5	0	1819	1227	148.25%	52	2nd semi	Mitta United	14	9	93	Kiewa Sandy Creek	10	8	68
Barnawartha	12	0	6	0	2093	1499	139.63%	48	Preliminary	Thurgoona	14	9	93	Kiewa Sandy Creek	14	7	91
Wahgunyah	9	0	9	0	1832	1708	107.26%	36	Grand	Mitta United	18	11	119	Thurgoona	8	12	60
Yackandandah	9	0	9	0	1527	1607	95.02%	36									
Dederang Mt Beauty	8	0	10	0	1765	1746	101.09%	32									
Rutherglen	6	0	12	0	1704	1849	92.16%	24									
Beechworth	4	0	14	0	1277	1817	70.28%	16									
Tallangatta Valley	1	0	17	0	937	2354	39.80%	4									
Wodonga Saints	1	0	17	0	951	2966	32.06%	4									

==== 2013 season ====
Tallangatta DFL	Wins	Byes	Losses	Draws	For	Against	%	Pts	Final	Team	G	B	Pts	Team	G	B	Pts
Dederang Mt Beauty	16	0	1	1	2028	1040	195.00%	66	Elimination	Barnawartha	18	10	118	Kiewa Sandy Creek	14	9	93
Mitta United	13	0	5	0	1913	1218	157.06%	52	Qualifying	Mitta United	13	17	95	Thurgoona	10	8	68
Thurgoona	13	0	5	0	1893	1347	140.53%	52	1st semi	Barnawartha	18	11	119	Thurgoona	10	11	71
Kiewa Sandy Creek	12	0	6	0	1858	1235	150.45%	48	2nd semi	Mitta United	10	12	72	Dederang Mt Beauty	8	4	52
Barnawartha	11	0	6	1	1716	1417	121.10%	46	Preliminary	Barnawartha	12	12	84	Dederang Mt Beauty	8	6	54
Rutherglen	11	0	7	0	1739	1247	139.45%	44	Grand	Barnawartha	13	14	92	Mitta United	11	6	72
Chiltern	7	0	10	1	1140	1368	83.33%	30									
Wahgunyah	7	0	10	1	1429	1775	80.51%	30									
Yackandandah	6	0	12	0	1088	1782	61.05%	24									
Wodonga Saints	5	0	13	0	1423	1829	77.80%	20									
Tallangatta Valley	4	0	14	0	1245	1819	68.44%	16									
Beechworth	1	0	17	0	720	2115	34.04%	4									

==== 2014 season ====
Tallangatta DFL	Wins	Byes	Losses	Draws	For	Against	%	Pts	Final	Team	G	B	Pts	Team	G	B	Pts
Kiewa Sandy Creek	16	0	2	0	2016	1080	186.67%	64	Elimination	Barnawartha	17	7	109	Chiltern	9	4	58
Mitta United	14	0	4	0	1671	984	169.82%	56	Qualifying	Thurgoona	13	19	97	Mitta United	10	11	71
Thurgoona	13	0	5	0	2031	1425	142.53%	52	1st semi	Mitta United	13	8	86	Barnawartha	8	13	61
Barnawartha	12	0	6	0	1526	1161	131.44%	48	2nd semi	Kiewa Sandy Creek	12	15	87	Thurgoona	12	12	84
Chiltern	11	0	7	0	1592	1360	117.06%	44	Preliminary	Mitta United	17	12	114	Thurgoona	9	13	67
Dederang Mt Beauty	11	0	7	0	1562	1446	108.02%	44	Grand	Kiewa Sandy Creek	16	12	108	Mitta United	14	7	91
Wahgunyah	8	0	10	0	1614	1682	95.96%	32									
Rutherglen	6	0	12	0	1331	1728	77.03%	24									
Wodonga Saints	5	0	13	0	1279	1849	69.17%	20									
Beechworth	4	0	14	0	1290	1767	73.01%	16									
Yackandandah	4	0	14	0	1179	1958	60.21%	16									
Tallangatta Valley	4	0	14	0	915	1566	58.43%	16									

- 2014 Season: Senior Football
  - Premiers: Kiewa-Sandy Creek (defeated Mitta United 16.12.108 to 14.7.91).
  - Minor Premiers: Kiewa-Sandy Creek (Wins: 16, Draws: 0, Losses: 2).
  - Wooden Spoon: Tallangatta (Wins: 4, Draws: 0, Losses: 14).
  - Barton Medal – Best & Fairest: 33 Votes: Cameron McNeill, Barnawartha.
  - Leading Goalkicker: 86 Goals: Samuel Cross, Thurgoona.
- 2014 Season: A-Grade Netball
  - Premiers: Thurgoona (defeated Barnawartha 51 to 50).
  - Minor Premiers: Thurgoona (Wins: 17, Draws: 0, Losses: 1).
  - Wooden Spoon: Dederang-Mt Beauty (Wins: 3, Draws: 0, Losses: 15).
  - Best & Fairest: ? Votes: Emma Johnson, Yackandandah.
  - Leading Goalscorer: 696 Goals: Lauren Coelli,
    Thurgoona
- 2014 Season: Football & Netball Club Championship
  - Champions: Thurgoona.

==== 2015 season ====
Tallangatta DFL	Wins	Byes	Losses	Draws	For	Against	%	Pts	Final	Team	G	B	Pts	Team	G	B	Pts
Kiewa Sandy Creek	17	0	0	1	2253	714	315.55%	70	Elimination	Chiltern	21	11	137	Rutherglen	11	7	73
Thurgoona	11	0	6	1	1817	1264	143.75%	46	Qualifying	Tallangatta	17	18	120	Thurgoona	12	8	80
Tallangatta	11	0	7	0	1833	1137	161.21%	44	1st semi	Chiltern	19	16	130	Thurgoona	19	4	118
Chiltern	11	0	7	0	1581	1073	147.34%	44	2nd semi	Tallangatta	14	15	99	Kiewa Sandy Creek	13	11	89
Rutherglen	10	0	8	0	1596	1304	122.39%	40	Preliminary	Kiewa Sandy Creek	21	13	139	Chiltern	8	6	54
Beechworth	10	0	8	0	1378	1176	117.18%	40	Grand	Tallangatta	11	10	76	Kiewa Sandy Creek	9	21	75
Yackandandah	10	0	8	0	1633	1496	109.16%	40									
Wahgunyah	9	0	9	0	1677	1519	110.40%	36									
Mitta United	8	0	10	0	1524	1203	126.68%	32									
Barnawartha	8	0	10	0	1456	1400	104.00%	32									
Dederang Mt Beauty	2	0	16	0	1009	2017	50.02%	8									
Wodonga Saints	0	0	18	0	416	3870	10.75%	0									

==== 2016 season ====
Tallangatta DFL	Wins	Byes	Losses	Draws	For	Against	%	Pts	Final	Team	G	B	Pts	Team	G	B	Pts
Mitta United	16	0	2	0	2102	889	236.45%	64	Elimination	Barnawartha	20	12	132	Kiewa Sandy Creek	6	7	43
Thurgoona	14	0	4	0	2295	1129	203.28%	56	Qualifying	Thurgoona	20	15	135	Rutherglen	10	14	74
Rutherglen	14	0	4	0	2133	1241	171.88%	56	1st semi	Barnawartha	15	21	111	Rutherglen	9	11	65
Kiewa Sandy Creek	14	0	4	0	1857	1140	162.89%	56	2nd semi	Thurgoona	20	11	131	Mitta United	5	13	43
Barnawartha	13	0	5	0	2295	1107	207.32%	52	Preliminary	Mitta United	12	7	79	Barnawartha	10	10	70
Tallangatta	9	0	9	0	1974	1348	146.44%	36	Grand	Thurgoona	18	20	128	Mitta United	10	8	68
Wahgunyah	7	0	11	0	1542	1457	105.83%	28									
Yackandandah	7	0	11	0	1484	1630	91.04%	28									
Beechworth	7	0	11	0	1545	1707	90.51%	28									
Chiltern	5	0	13	0	1390	1518	91.57%	20									
Dederang Mt Beauty	2	0	16	0	599	3010	19.90%	8									
Wodonga Saints	0	0	18	0	463	3503	13.22%	0									

==== 2017 season ====
2017 Season

Football – Senior

Ladder		Wins	Losses	Draws	FF	For	Against	%	Pts
1	Thurgoona	16	2	0	0	2462	1183	208.11%	64
2	Wahgunyah	14	4	0	0	1821	1036	175.77%	56
3	Kiewa-Sandy Creek	14	4	0	0	1979	1226	161.42%	56
4	Rutherglen	12	6	0	0	1978	1250	158.24%	48
5	Mitta United	11	5	2	0	1716	1349	127.21%	48
6	Yackandandah	9	8	1	0	1721	1527	112.70%	38
7	Barnawartha	8	9	1	0	1550	1261	122.92%	34
8	Tallangatta	7	10	1	0	1466	1447	101.31%	30
9	Beechworth	6	11	1	0	1477	1915	77.13%	26
10	Chiltern	5	13	0	0	1331	1867	71.29%	20
11	Wodonga Saints	2	16	0	0	871	2510	34.70%	8
12	Dederang-Mt. Beauty	1	17	0	0	704	2505	28.10%	4

Finals		Team	G	B	Pts	Team	G	B	Pts
"A"	Qualifying	Wahgunyah	9	10	64	Kiewa-Sandy Creek	13	8	86
"B"	Elimination	Rutherglen	17	12	114	Mitta United	15	10	100
"C"	Major Semi	Thurgoona	10	13	73	Kiewa-Sandy Creek	9	16	70
"D"	Minor Semi	Wahgunyah	8	11	59	Rutherglen	10	20	80
"E"	Preliminary	Kiewa-Sandy Creek	18	9	117	Rutherglen	12	14	86
"F"	Grand	Thurgoona	22	10	142	Kiewa-Sandy Creek	8	9	58

- = Minor Premiers.
- = Finalist.
- Best & Fairest "Barton Medallist": Lee Dale – Yackandandah (27 votes).
- Leading Goalkicker: Liam Stephens – Beechworth (46 goals).

Football – Reserve

Ladder		Wins	Losses	Draws	FF	For	Against	%	Pts
1	Thurgoona	16	2	0	0	2049	525	309.29%	64
2	Wahgunyah	15	3	0	0	1950	729	267.49%	60
3	Yackandandah	15	3	0	0	1663	707	235.22%	60
4	Rutherglen	14	4	0	0	1909	789	241.95%	56
5	Kiewa-Sandy Creek	12	6	0	0	1484	879	168.83%	48
6	Mitta United	8	10	0	0	1101	1408	78.20%	32
7	Chiltern	7	10	1	0	1025	1310	78.24%	30
8	Tallangatta	6	12	0	0	716	1401	51.11%	24
9	Beechworth	6	12	0	0	776	1694	45.81%	24
10	Barnawatha	5	13	0	0	767	1517	50.56%	20
11	Wodonga Saints	3	15	0	0	734	1762	41.66%	12
12	Dederang-Mt. Beauty	0	17	1	0	491	1944	25.26%	2

Finals		Team	G	B	Pts	Team	G	B	Pts
"A"	Qualifying	Wahgunyah	7	9	51	Yackandandah	9	7	61
"B"	Elimination	Rutherglen	13	6	84	Kiewa-Sandy Creek	7	13	55
"C"	Major Semi	Thurgoona	11	9	75	Yackandandah	10	3	63
"D"	Minor Semi	Wahgunyah	6	6	42	Rutherglen	12	7	79
"E"	Preliminary	Yackandandah	8	8	56	Rutherglen	6	17	53
"F"	Grand (A.E.T.)	Thurgoona	8	7	55	Yackandandah	10	7	67

- = Minor Premiers.
- = Finalist.
- Best & Fairest Medallist: James Davies – Yackandandah (23 votes)
  & Liam McDonell – Wahgunyah (23 votes).
- Leading Goalkicker: Brett O’Rourke – Wahgunyah (101 goals).

== Interleague / community championships ==
The Tallangatta & District Football League has never won the first division of the Victorian Country Championship / Victorian Community Championship interleague championship. In interleague competition the team wears a blue guernsey, emblazoned with a monogram-style gold "TDFL" initials, with blue and gold trim shorts and blue and gold trim socks.

- The Tallangatta & District Football League left Victorian Community Championships in favour of focusing on a local interleague arrangement in 2016 and are no longer have an Interleague ranking. Their current arrangement is with the Ovens & King Football Netball League & the Hume Australian Football Netball League (NSW), where there is only one game being played involving teams "A" & "B" while team "C" enjoy a bye round that season.

Year	Grade (Note: The "Under Age" Interleague game is contested as either "Under 19's", "Under 18's", or "Under 17's" depending on the opposing league's under age competition structure.)	G	B	Pts	Home	G	B	Pts	Away	Ground
2009	Seniors	7	7	49	Tallangatta & DFL	5	14	44	Hume AFNL (NSW)	?
2010	No Interleague football played for this season.									
2011	No Interleague football played for this season.									
2012	No Interleague football played for this season.									
2013	Seniors	23	13	151	Tallangatta & DFL	7	6	48	Hume AFNL (NSW)	Albury Sports Ground
2013	Under Age	7	6	48	Tallangatta & DFL	11	14	80	Hume AFNL (NSW)	Albury Sports Ground
2014	Seniors	6	6	42	Kyabram District FNL	24	9	153	Tallangatta & DFL	Albury Sports Ground
2014	Under Age	6	12	48	Kyabram District FNL	12	10	82	Tallangatta & DFL	Albury Sports Ground
2015	Seniors	18	19	127	Riverina FNL (NSW)	7	5	47	Tallangatta & DFL	Robertson Oval (Wagga Wagga)
2015	Under Age	6	15	51	Riverina FNL (NSW)	7	4	46	Tallangatta & DFL	Robertson Oval (Wagga Wagga)
2016	Seniors	18	17	115	Ovens & King FNL	12	14	86	Tallangatta & DFL	W.J. Findlay Oval (Wangaratta)
2016	Under Age	2	1	13	Ovens & King FNL	17	15	117	Tallangatta & DFL	W.J. Findlay Oval (Wangaratta)
2017	Seniors	8	15	63	Tallangatta & DFL	20	13	133	Hume AFNL (NSW)	Sandy Creek Oval (Sandy Creek)
2017	Under Age	5	7	37	Tallangatta & DFL	20	11	131	Hume AFNL (NSW)	Sandy Creek Oval (Sandy Creek)
2018	No Interleague football played for this season.									
