= Hume Football Netball League =

Australian rules football and netball competition

Hume Australian Football Netball League
- Current season, competition or edition: 2024
- Sport: Australian rules football Netball
- Founded: 1933; 93 years ago
- CEO: Dalton Wegener
- President: Phillip Bouffler
- No. of teams: 12
- Country: Australia
- Venue: Grand Finals at: Walbundrie
- Most recent champion: Osborne (18) (2025)
- Most titles: Osborne (18)
- Sponsor: WAW Bank
- Website: humefl.com.au

The Hume Australian Football Netball League (HFNL), often shortened to Hume Football League, is an Australian rules football and netball competition containing twelve clubs based in the South West Slopes and southern Riverina regions of New South Wales, Australia. The league features four grades in the Australian rules football competition, with these being First-Grade, Reserve-Grade, Under 17s and Under 14s. In the netball competition, there are six grades, with these being A-Grade, B-Grade, C-Grade, C-Reserve Grade, Intermediates and Juniors.

Currently, a home and away season consisting of 18 rounds is played. The best six teams then play-off according to the McIntyre system, culminating in the HFL Grand Final, which is traditionally hosted by Walbundrie.

== History ==
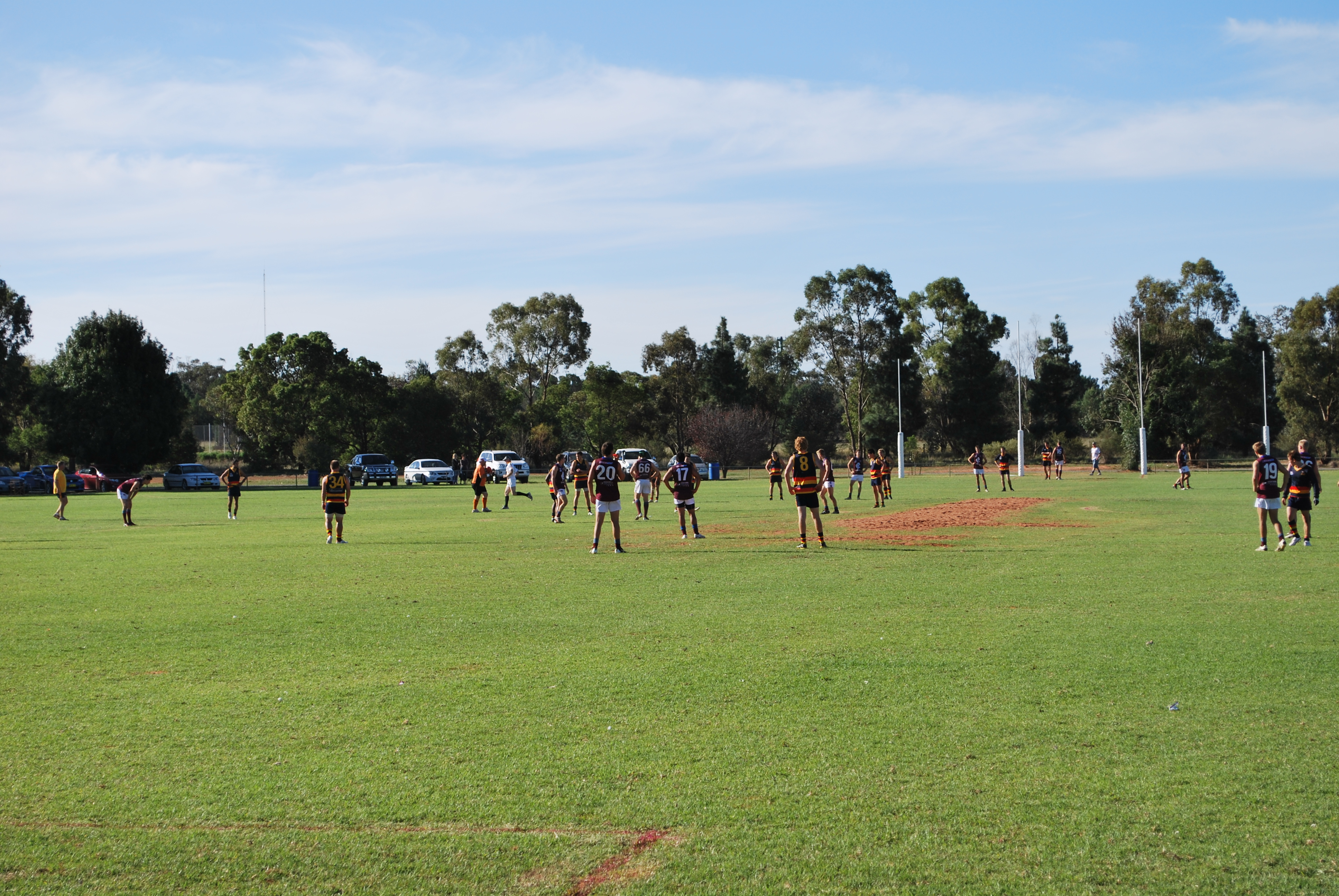
Billabong Crows FNC v Culcairn FNC

Prior to the formation of the Hume Football League, various football associations and leagues had been organised in the southern Riverina area since the late 19th century, including the Hume Football Association (1922 to 1926), the Central Hume Football Association (1928 to 1934), the Albury & District Football League (1930 to 1957) and the Riverina Main Line Football Association. The latter was organised in 1922 amongst clubs in towns that lay on the railway spur from the main Sydney-Melbourne line at Culcairn as far west as Balldale, as in the years pre-World War II, cars were still a relatively uncommon form of transport, with horses still being prevalent in the area.

Hume Football Association – 1922 to 1926.

There was an original Hume Football Association that was formed in 1922 and ran from 1922 to 1926 during its short history.

- Premiers / Runners Up
  - 1922 – Bulgandra: 8.12 – 60 defeated Walla Walla: 6.4 – 40. Other teams were Brocklesby, Burrumbuttock and Walbundrie.
  - 1923 – Burrumbuttock: 6.8 – 38 d Brocklesby: 6.5 – 35. Other teams were Bulgandra, Walbundrie and Walla Walla. Brocklesby & Walla Walla joined the Riverina Main Line Football Association in 1924.
  - 1924 – Bulgandra d Burrumbuttock. Other teams were Walbundrie and Walla Walla Sub Division (Ramblers). The Walla Walla Subdivision FC joined the Riverina Main Line Football Association in 1925. Burrumbuttock joined the Albury B. Grade Football Association in 1925.
  - 1925 – The Hume FA had an AGM in March 1925 with three club's, Bulgandra, Rand and Walbundrie interested in playing, but it appears the Hume FA went into recess in 1925.
  - 1926 – Rand: 10.3 – 64 d Bulgandra: 4.6 – 30. Other teams were Burrumbuttock and Walbundrie. Burrumbuttock joined the Albury & Border FA & Rand joined the Osborne FA in 1927, while Bulgandra and Walbundrie were forced to go into recess for 1927, as Walbundrie were refused entry into the Albury & Border FA. Bulgandra and Walbundrie then joined the Central Hume FA in 1928.

Appropriately, it was over concerns about travel times that caused the formation of the Hume Football League. The league was formed in 1933 by Jindera, Lavington, Gerogery and Border United (from Albury), who were disgruntled about the amount of travel required in the existing Central Hume Football Association. Gerogery won the inaugural season, winning the deciding Grand Final against Jindera.

In 1934, Border United withdrew after one season to be replaced by Bethanga, and Gerogery won their second premiership in a Grand Final against Lavington. In 1935, Walla Walla, Walbundrie and Burrumbuttock joined from the Central Hume Football Association, which was then dissolved.

The league's roster was relatively unstable in early years as clubs transferred from one local league to another, formed or disbanded.

- 1936: Wagga Road joined.
- 1939: Wagga Road and Bethanga left.
- 1940: Lavington withdrew.
- 1941–1944: In recess due to World War II.

=== Post-War ===
The league reconvened in 1945 towards the end of the war with the following clubs: Balldale, Brocklesby, Rand, Walbundrie and Walla Walla. As before, the league's membership continued to fluctuate in subsequent years.

- 1946: Gerogery and Jindera reformed and joined, Balldale moved to the Chiltern & District Football Association
- 1947: Balldale returned, Burrumbuttock reformed. Mr. Kelly Joseph Azzi, Balldale Football Club President and Delegate first donated the Azzi Medal in 1947 for the fairest and best player award
- 1948: Gerogery disbanded, East Albury Rovers joined.
- 1949: North Albury Seconds joined.
- 1950: The Hume Junior Football League was formed from the following teams – Jindera, St. Paul's College – Walla, Walbundrie and Walla.
- 1951: East Albury Rovers merge with North Albury Seconds, who enter a Hume FL team as North Albury Seconds.
- 1953: North Albury Seconds left to play in the newly formed Ovens & Murray Football League Second Eighteen football competition and Howlong joined from Chiltern & District Football Association.

After the admission of Howlong, the make-up of the league remained stable until 1970 when Boree Creek joined from the Coreen & District Football League and Osborne joined from the Central Riverina Football League (the precursor to the Riverina Football League). At this point the competition had ten teams.

Balldale disbanded in February 1975, causing a bye. In 1975, Lavington fielded a team in the Hume Football League, in addition to the Tallangatta & District Football League, for two years. In 1976, a reserves competition was introduced and Boree Creek moved back to the Coreen & District Football League. After two seasons, the Lavington side moved to the Farrer Football League in 1977 (to later join the Ovens & Murray Football League in 1979), with a new club, East Lavington, taking their place.

=== Modern era ===
Since the 1970s and 1980s, increased mobility has meant that the original motivations behind the league's formation have lessened, and the league has taken in more teams from beyond its original domain, to cover more of the rural area between the regional cities of Albury and Wagga Wagga. Henty joined the Hume Football League in 1980, and Lockhart joined in 1982, both from the Farrer Football League. Rand moved to the Coreen & District Football League in 1983. Culcairn and Holbrook joined the league from the Tallangatta & District Football League in 1992 and 1999 respectively. East Lavington disbanded at the end of 1997.

At the same time, economic concerns and the effect of migration from rural areas on the number of participants, leading to difficulties fielding teams, has meant that clubs from smaller neighbouring towns are electing to merge rather than disband completely, thus in 2006 two merged entities competed for the first time, the Brocklesby Burrumbuttock Football Club and the Rand Walbundrie Football Club.

In recent years on the playing arena, Osborne has tended to dominate the competition, though the league remains fairly competitive with most clubs providing a challenge.

Due to the disbanding of the neighbouring Coreen & District Football League, most of its teams were moved to the Hume Football League, bringing the number to fifteen for the 2008 season; these were Billabong Crows (a merger of the former Urana and Oaklands Football Clubs), Coleambally, Coreen-Daysdale-Hopefield-Buraja United (CDHBU), Murray Magpies and Rennie. Rennie retained the "Hoppers" nickname, sharing it with Walla Walla.

With the increasing size of the competition, an initial proposal to split the league into two pools for the 2009 season, organised geographically into western and eastern divisions and possibly including other nearby clubs was tabled in July 2007. This may be considered as part of an overall independent review of Australian football in the Riverina.

Rennie moved to the Picola & District Football League in 2009.

Coleambally moved to the Farrer Football League in 2011.

During the 2015/16 off season both the Walla Hoppers and Rand-Walbundrie Tigers football clubs entered merger talks for 2016 Hume Football League season. Voting for the proposed merger took place on Monday 7 March (2016). Walla Walla Hoppers members voted 100 per cent in favour of the joint venture; while The Rand-Walbundrie Tigers voted 83 per cent in favour. The merged club commenced in 2016 playing home matches at Rand.

Due to the COVID-19 Pandemic there was no football or netball competitions in 2020 and in 2021 there was only 16 rounds completed, but there was no final series played, once again due to COVID-19.

==== Current finals system ====
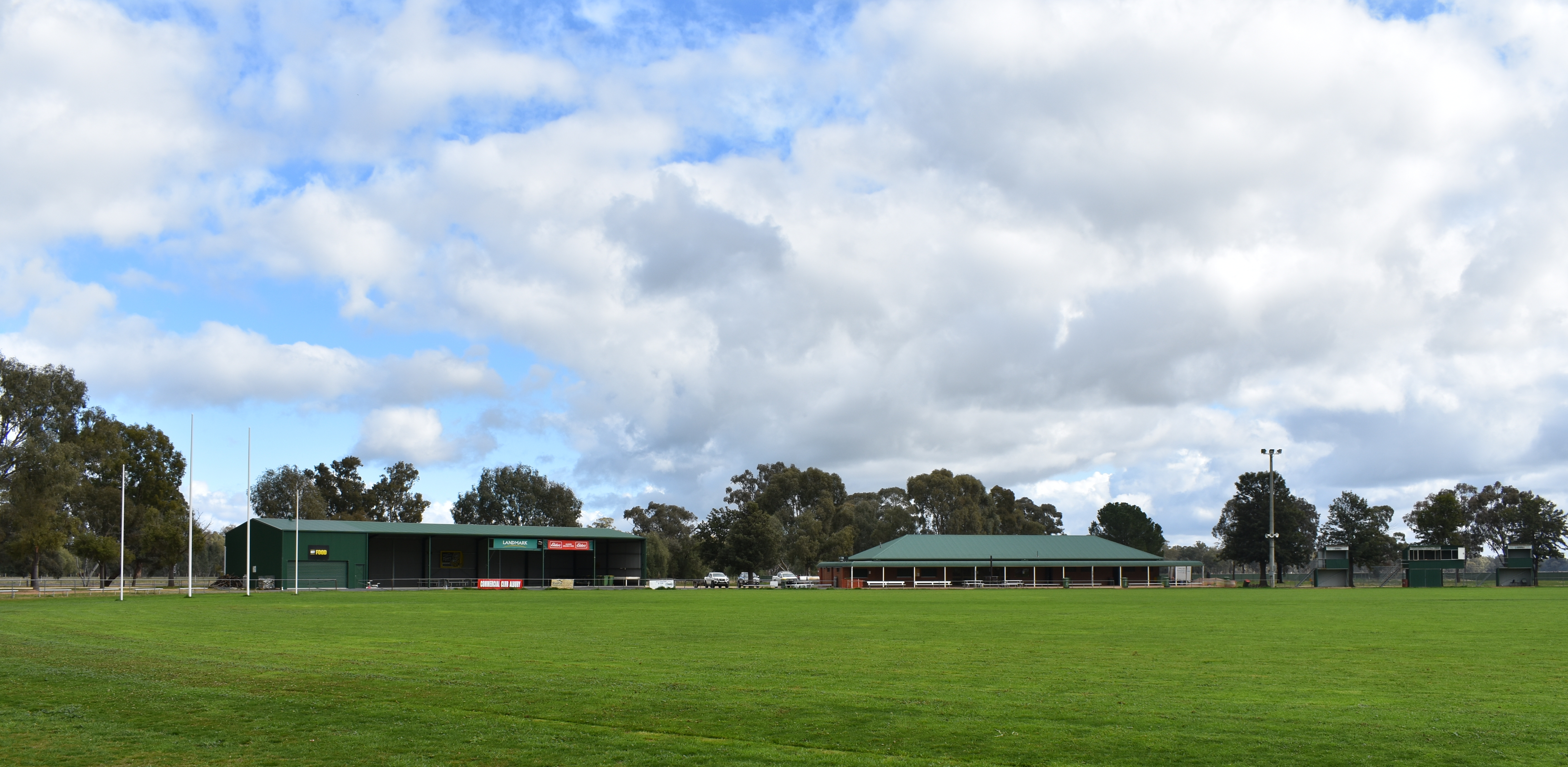
Walbundrie Sportsground

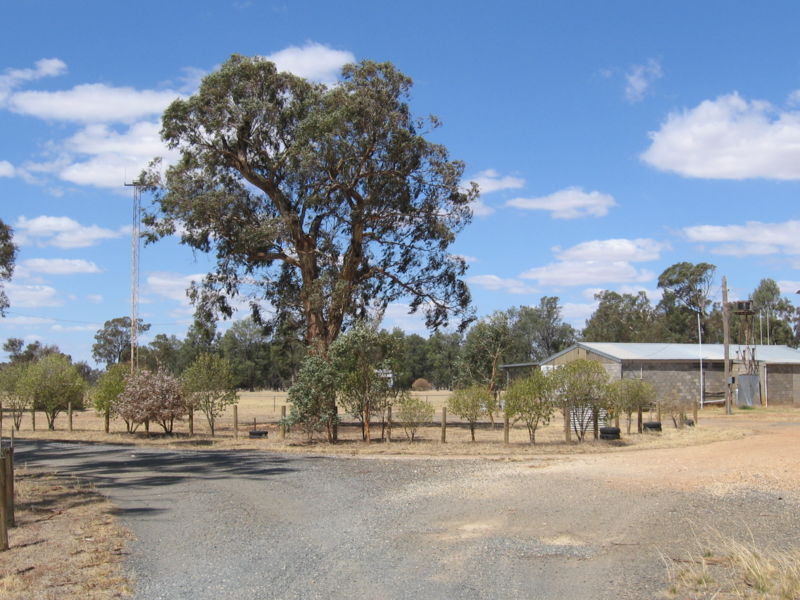
Buraja Recreation Reserve

The HFL & HNA currently uses the "McIntyre system". The final series is played over four weekends, with the grand final traditionally being played on the third Saturday of September.

Traditionally since 1976 all finals for both football and netball have been played at the Walbundrie Showground.

Since then the only finals to be played elsewhere were the 1989 Grand Final at East Lavington, 2019 Minor Semi-final at Urana Road Oval, 2022 Minor Semi-final at Howlong Sportsground and 2023 Minor Semi-final at Holbrook Sports Complex.

==== 2022 Finals Series ====
Elimination finals
3 | Howlong | 8.9 (57)
6 | Rand-Walbundrie-Walla | 11.15 (81)
4 | Brock-Burrum Saints | 14.10 (94)
5 | Jindera | 14.12 (96)

Major/Minor semifinals
1 | Osborne | 11.5 (71)
2 | Holbrook | 8.5 (55)
Jindera | 16.9 (105)
Rand-Walbundrie-Walla | 10.12 (72)

Preliminary final
Holbrook | 15.9 (99)
Jindera | 9.9 (63)

Grand Final
Osborne | 7.8 (50)
Holbrook | 11.13 (79)

==== 2023 Finals Series ====
Elimination finals
3 | Howlong | 9.16 (70)
6 | Brock-Burrum Saints | 13.5 (83)
4 | CDHBU | 10.9 (69)
5 | Rand-Walbundrie-Walla | 16.15 (111)

Major/Minor semifinals
1 | Osborne | 14.9 (93)
2 | Holbrook | 4.9 (33)
Brock-Burrum Saints | 8.8 (56)
Rand-Walbundrie-Walla | 17.13 (115)

Preliminary final
Holbrook | 12.9 (81)
Rand-Walbundrie-Walla | 8.8 (56)

Grand Final
Osborne | 15.16 (106)
Holbrook | 8.8 (56)

==== 2024 Finals Series ====
Elimination finals
3 | CDHBU | 23.12 (150)
6 | Rand-Walbundrie-Walla | 11.8 (74)
4 | Lockhart | 6.12 (48)
5 | Jindera | 8.8 (56)

Major/Minor semifinals
1 | Osborne | 7.12 (54)
2 | Holbrook | 6.6 (42)
CDHBU | 11.7 (73)
Jindera | 10.11 (71)

Preliminary final
Holbrook | 21.8 (134)
CDHBU | 4.12 (36)

Grand Final
Osborne | 9.9 (63)
Holbrook | 4.10 (34)

== Current clubs ==
Actual location of all the current Hume FNL clubs.

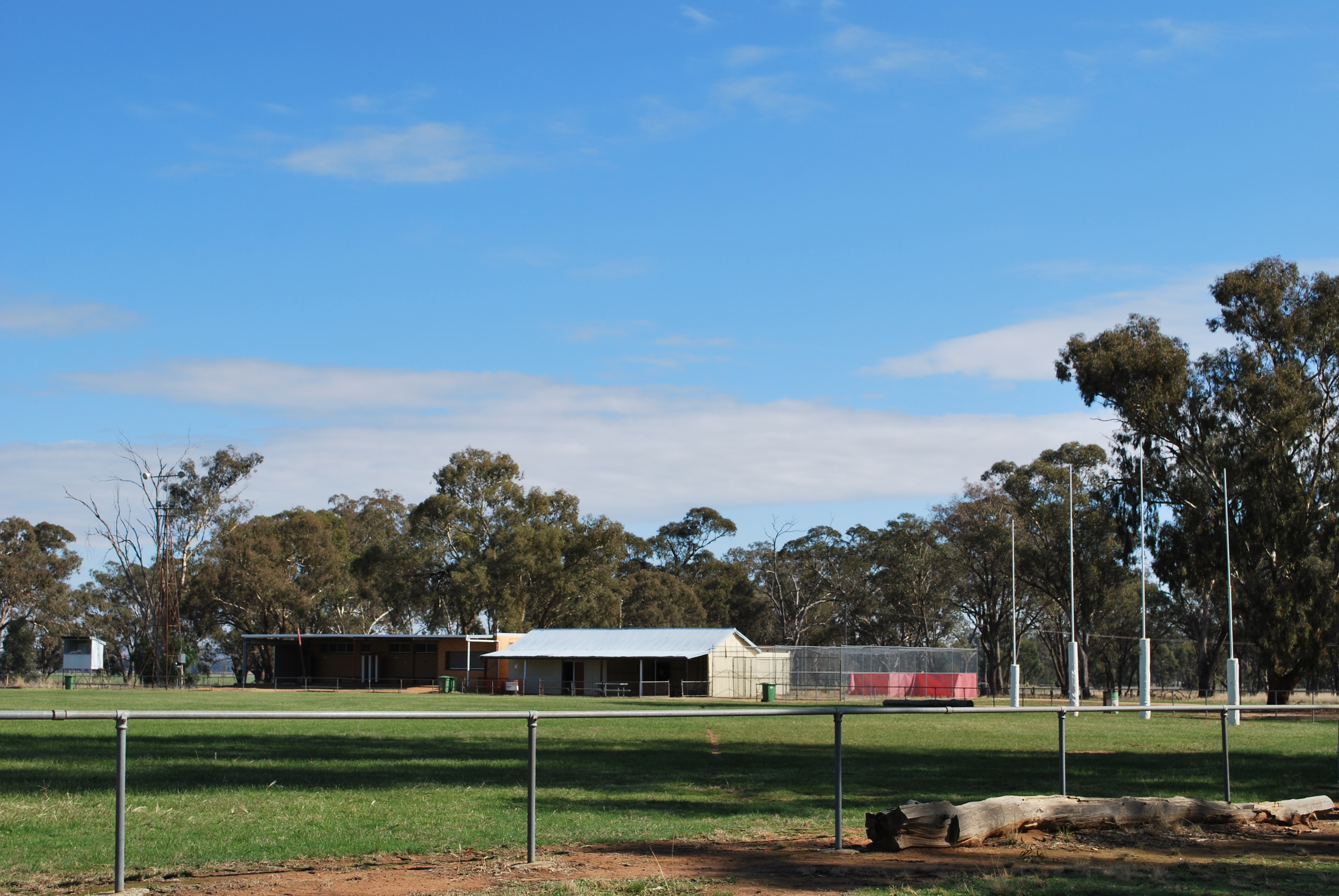
Brocklesby Recreation Reserve

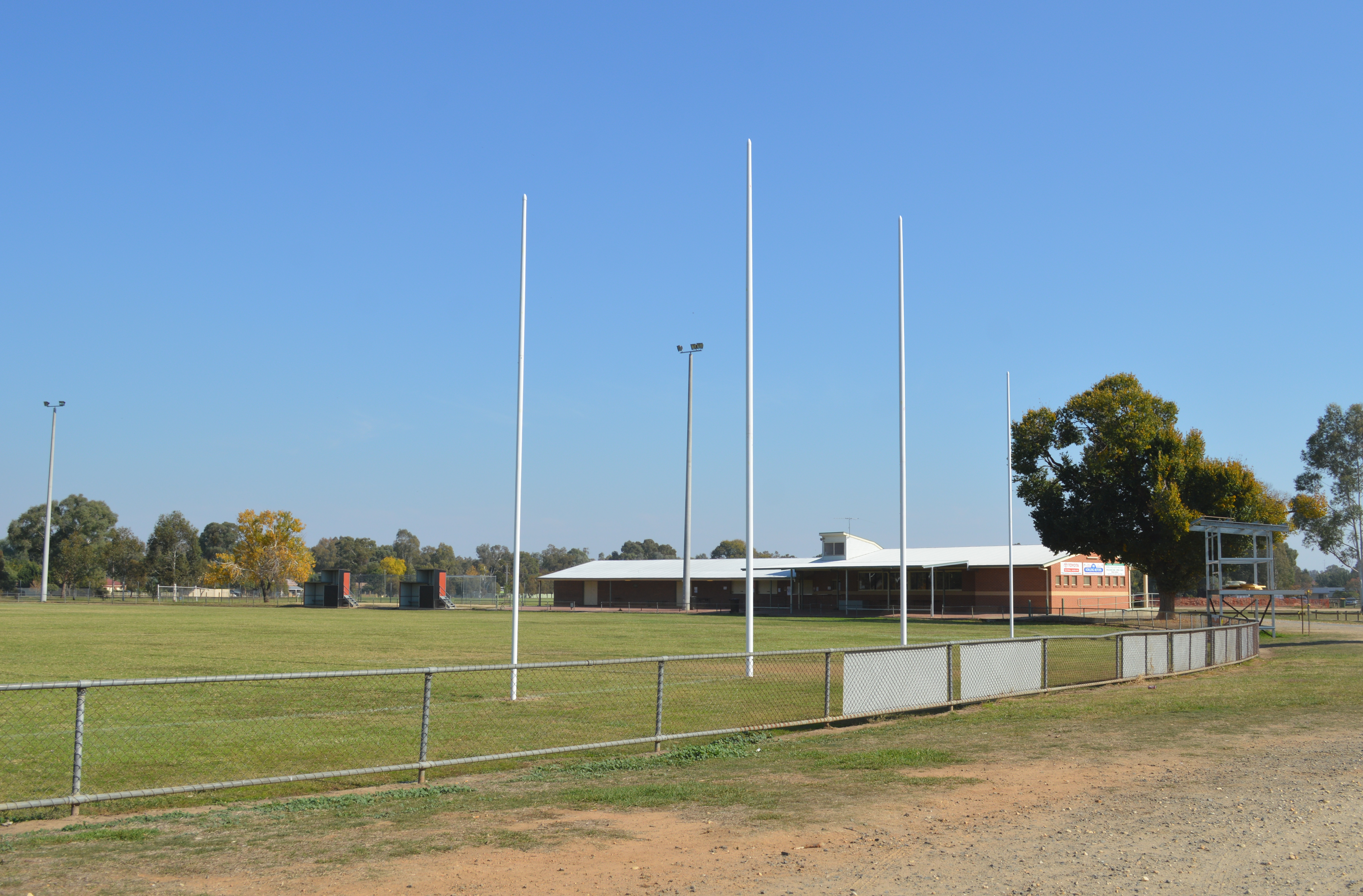
Howlong Football Ground / Clubrooms

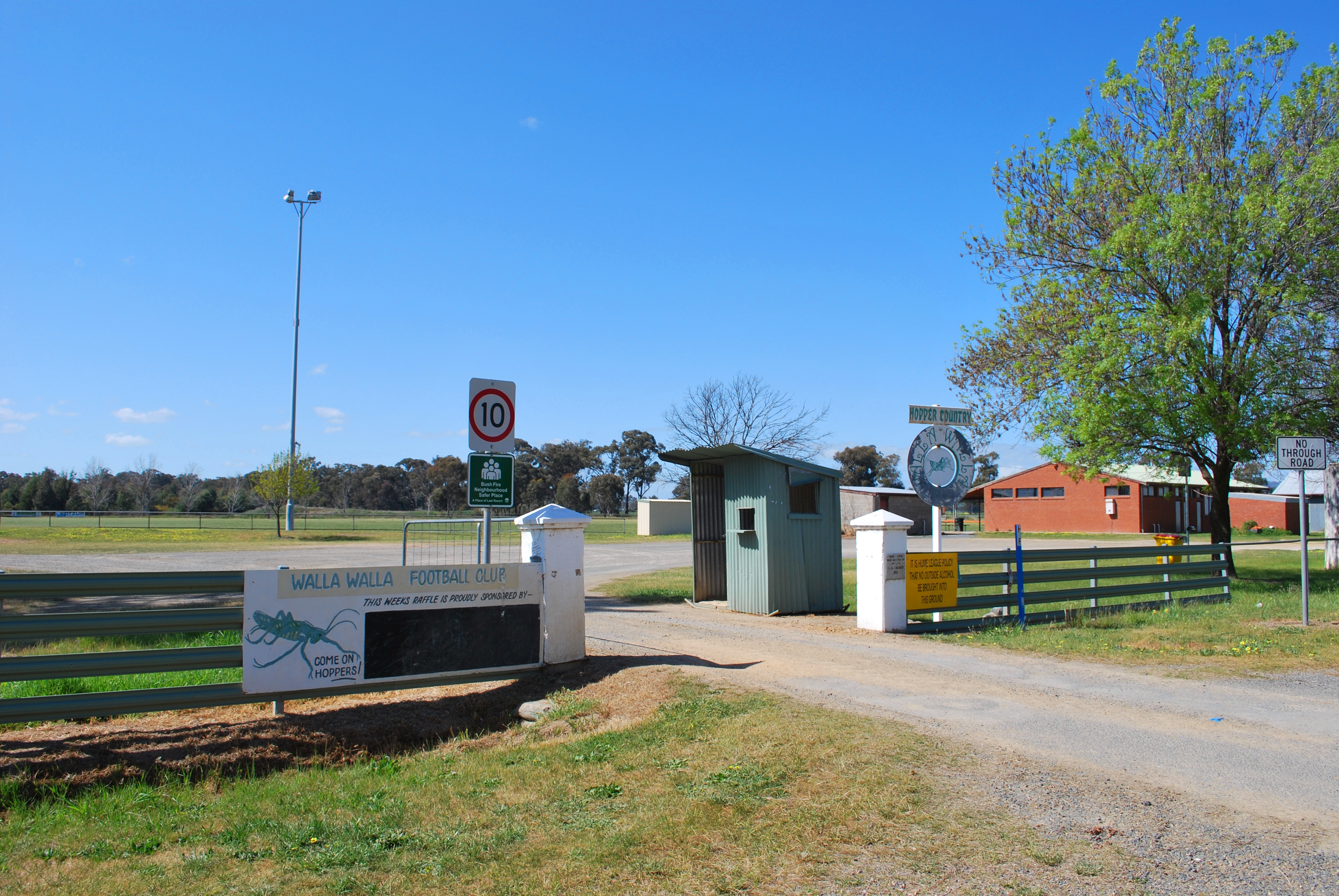
Walla Walla Football Ground

Locations of the Hume FNL clubs

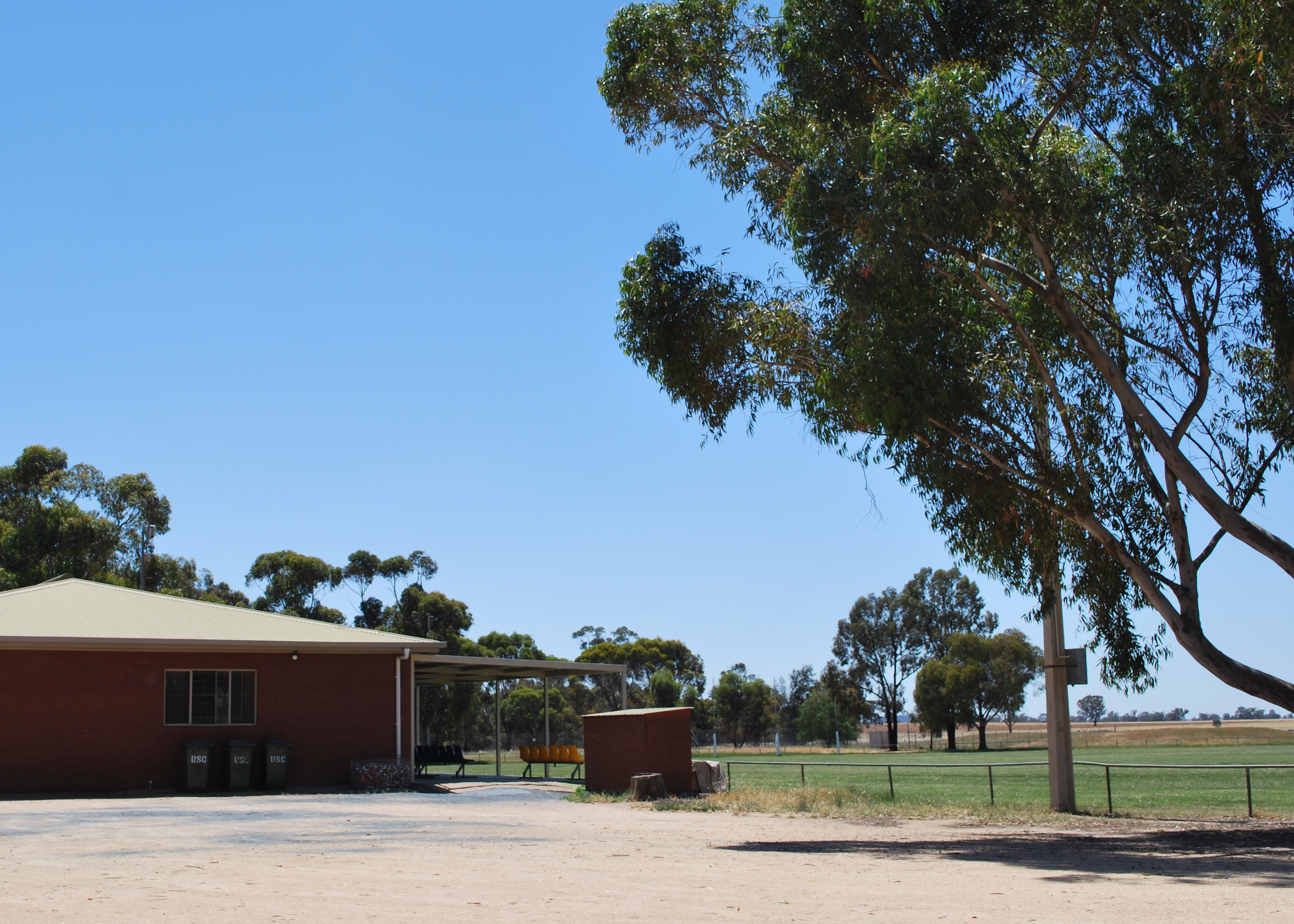
Rand Football Netball Ground

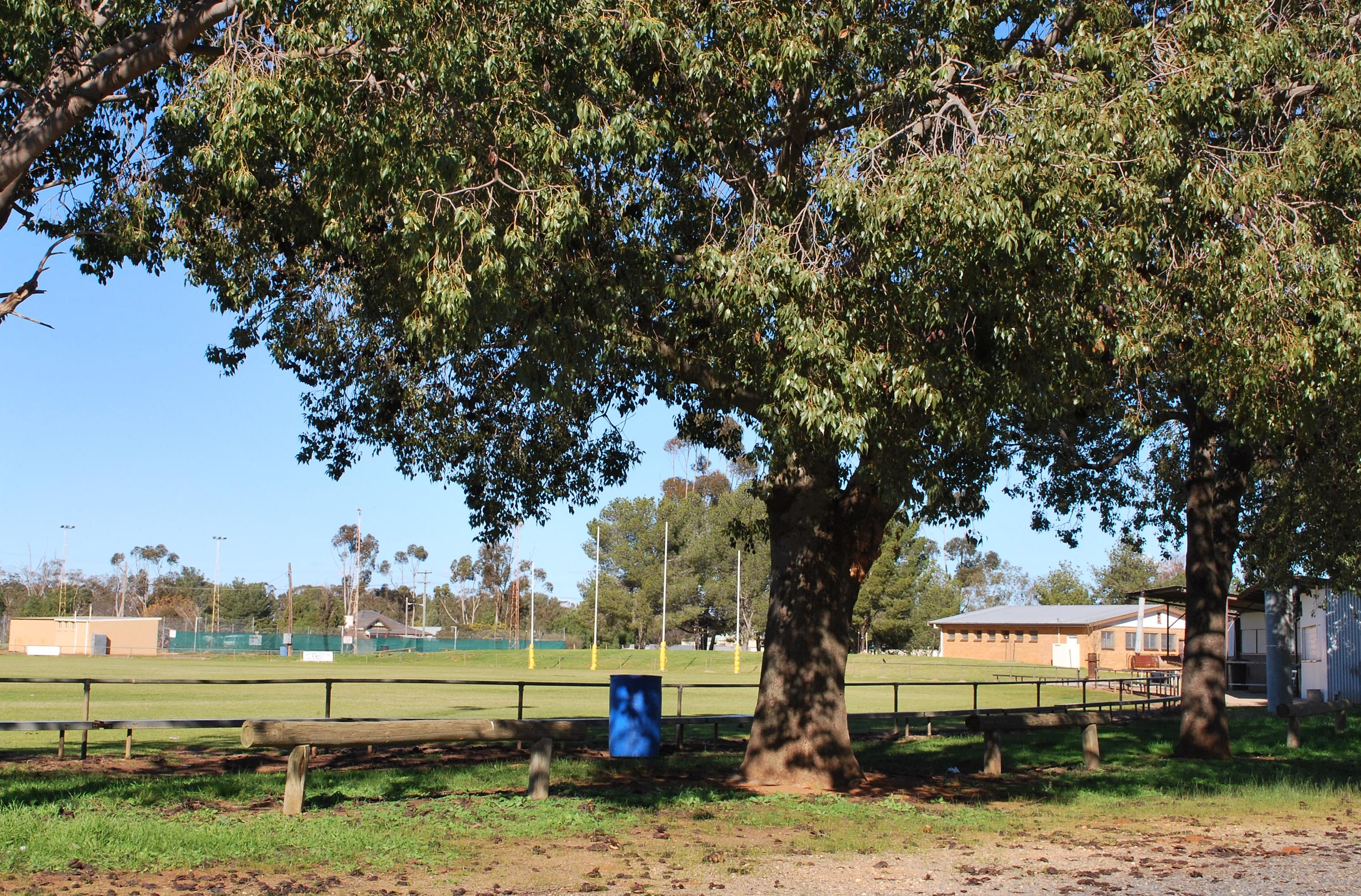
Oaklands Football Ground

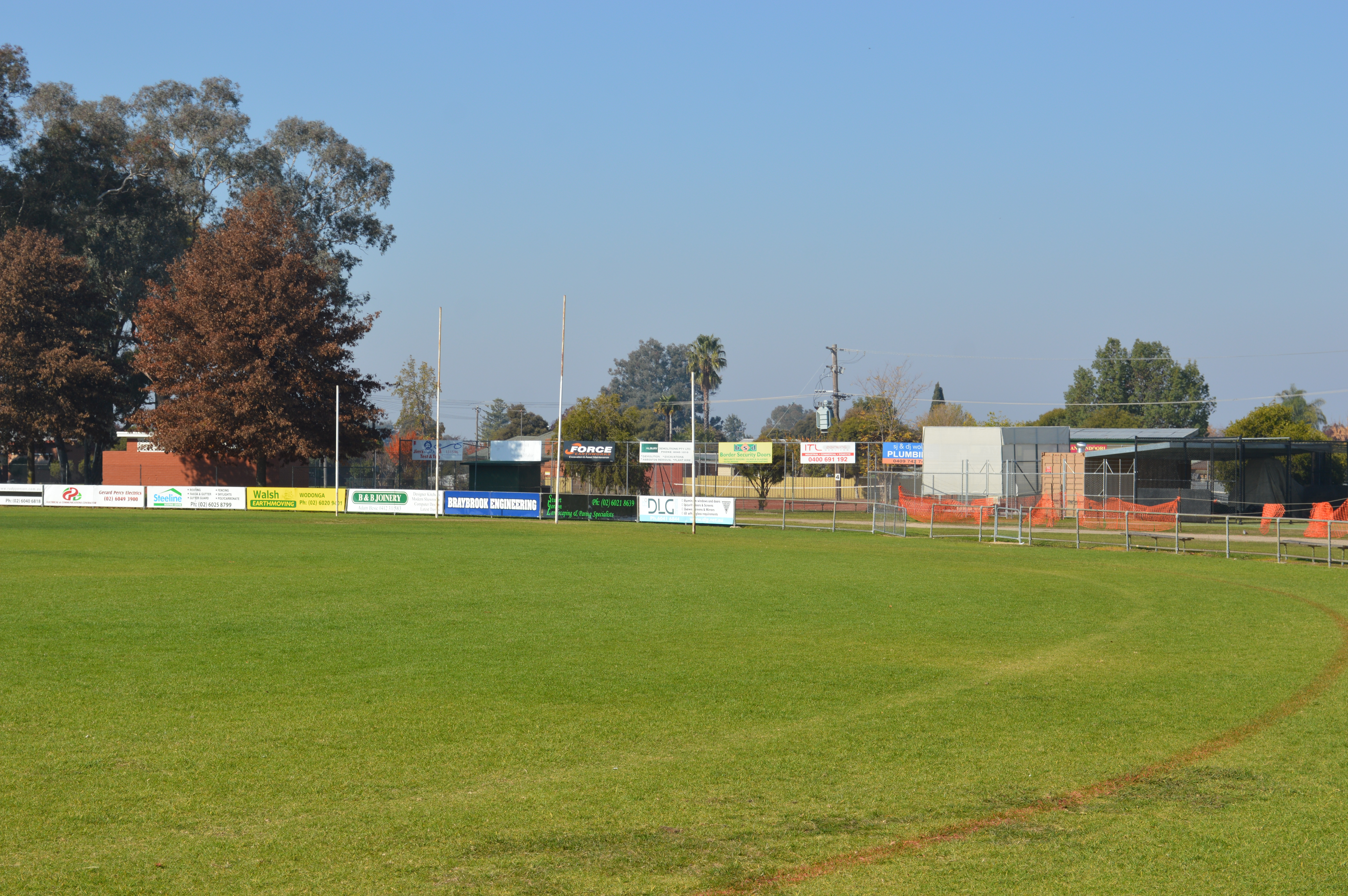
Urana Road Oval, Lavington

| Club | Colours | Moniker | Home Ground(s) | Former league | Est. | Years in HFNL | HFNL Senior Premierships | |
| Club | Colours | Moniker | Home Ground(s) | Former league | Est. | Years in HFNL | Total | Years |
|---|---|---|---|---|---|---|---|---|
| Billabong Crows | | Crows | Oaklands Recreation Ground, Oaklands and Urana Recreation Ground, Urana | C&DFL | 2005 | 2008–present | 0 | – |
| Brocklesby-Burrumbuttock | | Saints | Brocklesby Recreation Reserve, Brocklesby and Burrumbuttock Recreation Reserve, Burrumbuttock | – | 2006 | 2006–present | 4 | 2013, 2015, 2016, 2018 |
| Coreen-Daysdale-Hopefield-Buraja United | | Power | Coreen Oval, Coreen | – | 2006 | 2008–present | 0 | – |
| Culcairn | | Lions | Culcairn Sportsground, Culcairn | T&DFL | 1895 | 1992–present | 2 | 1993, 2007 |
| Henty | | Swans, Swampies | Henty Showground, Henty | FFL | 1895 | 1980–present | 6 | 1984, 1986, 1990, 1996, 2014, 2026 |
| Holbrook | | Brookers | Holbrook Sports Complex, Holbrook | T&DFL | 1882 | 1999–present | 2 | 2004, 2022 |
| Howlong | | Spiders | Howlong Oval, Howlong | C&DFL | 1898 | 1953–present | 6 | 1954, 1971, 1977, 1997, 2002, 2010 |
| Jindera | | Bulldogs | Jindera Sports Ground, Jindera | CHFA | 1900 | 1933–present | 11 | 1946, 1955, 1956, 1957, 1960, 1961, 1963, 1964, 1975, 2008, 2011 |
| Lockhart | | Demons | Lockhart Recreation Ground, Lockhart | FFL | 1898 | 1982–present | 2 | 1982, 2003 |
| Murray Magpies | | Magpies | Urana Road Oval, Lavington | C&DFL | 1997 | 2007–present | 0 | – |
| Osborne | | Tigers | Osborne Recreation Reserve, Osborne | CRFL | 1901 | 1970–present | 18 | 1985, 1991, 1992, 1994, 1995, 1998, 1999, 2000, 2001, 2005, 2006, 2009, 2012, 2017, 2019, 2023, 2024, 2025 |
| Rand-Walbundrie-Walla | | Giants | Rand Recreation Reserve, Rand, Walbundrie Showground, Walbundrie and Walla Walla Sportsground, Walla Walla | – | 2016 | 2016–present | 0 | – |

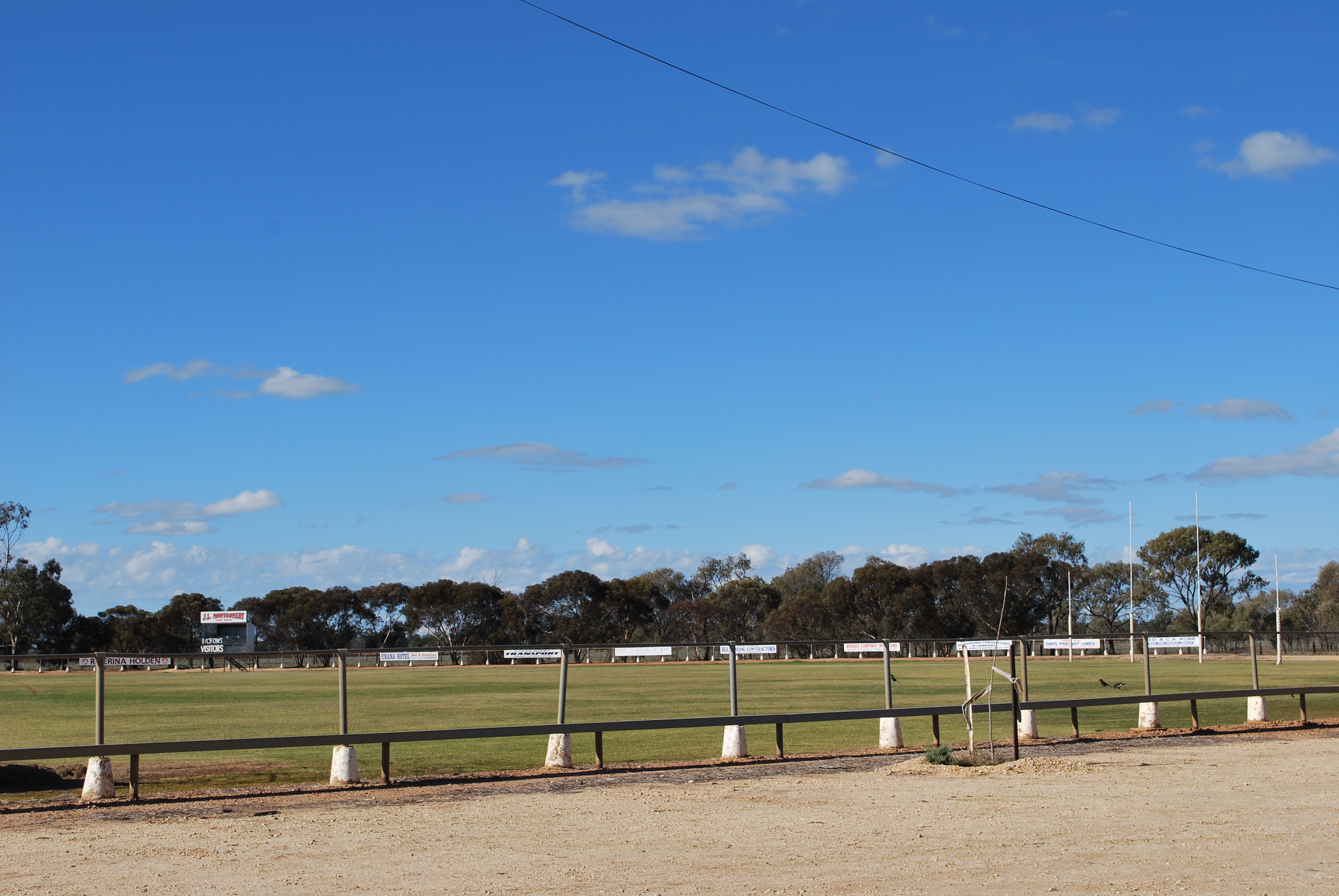
Urana Recreation Ground

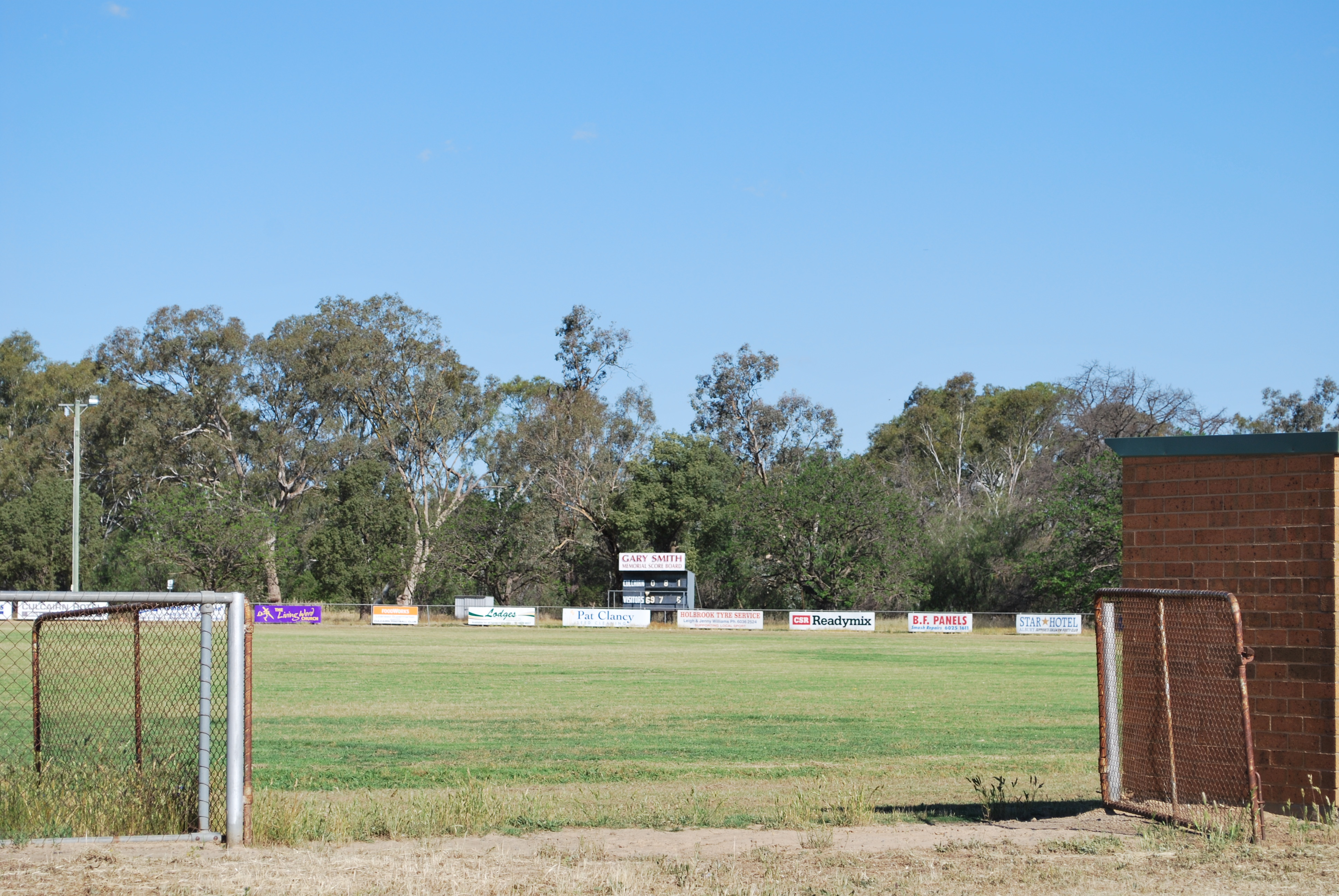
Culcairn Sportsground

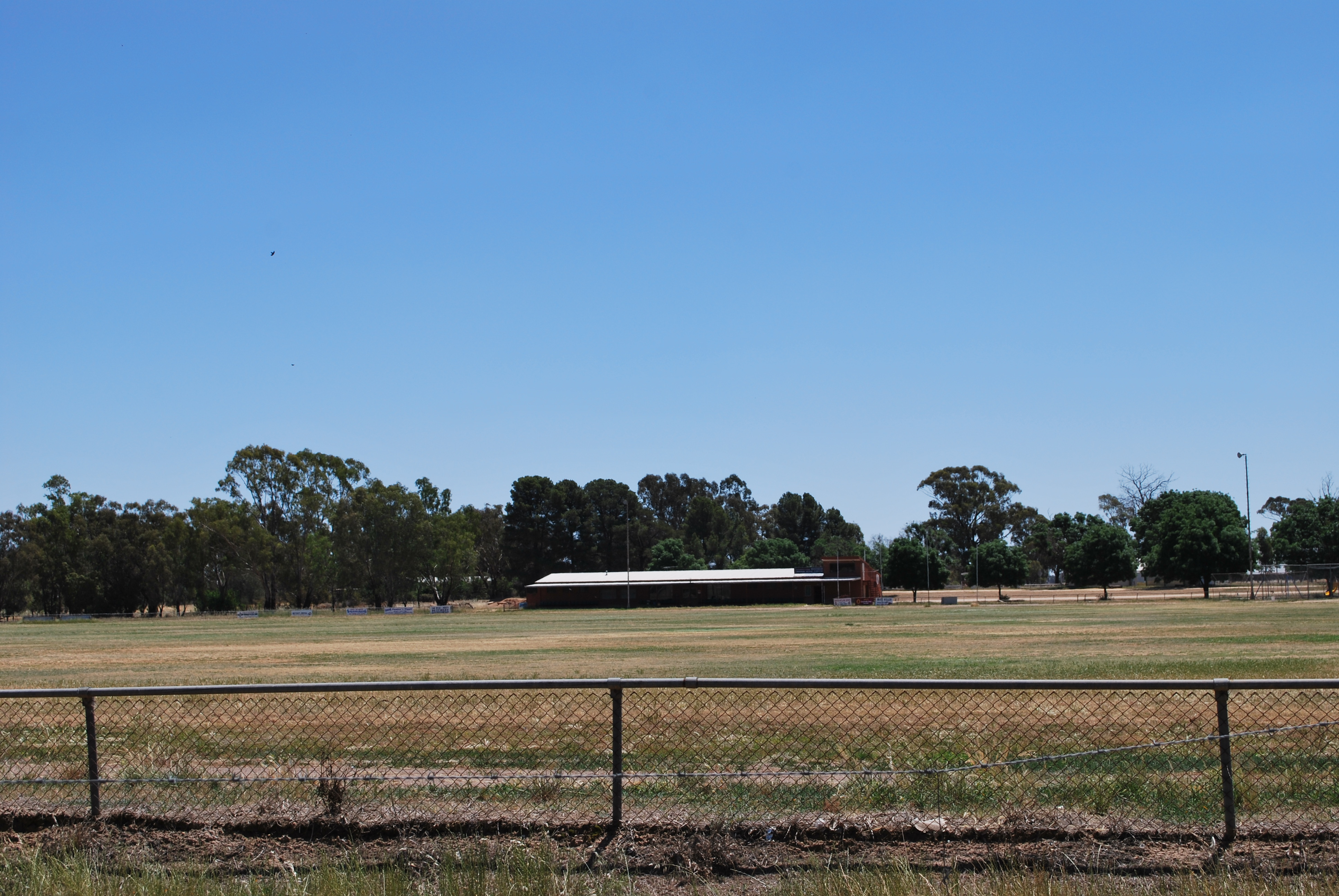
Henty Showgrounds

== Former clubs ==
| Club | Colours | Nickname | Home Ground | Former league | Est. | Years in HFNL | Premierships | | Fate |
| Club | Colours | Nickname | Home Ground | Former league | Est. | Years in HFNL | Total | Years | Fate |
|---|---|---|---|---|---|---|---|---|---|
| Balldale | (1945–53)(1954–75) | | Balldale Cricket Ground, Balldale | C&DFL | 1906 | 1945, 1947–1973 | 2 | 1962, 1972 | Returned to Chiltern & District FA in 1946. Returned to Coreen & District FL after 1973 season |
| Bethanga | | Bombers | Bethanga Recreation Reserve, Bethanga | T&DFL | 1907 | 1934–1938 | 0 | – | Moved to Dederang & District FL in 1939. |
| Border United 2nds | | | Albury Sportsground, Albury | – | 1933 | 1933 | 0 | – | Left league |
| Brocklesby | | Kangaroos | Brocklesby Recreation Reserve, Brocklesby | A&DFL | 1907 | 1945–2005 | 2 | 1950, 1958 | Merged with Burrumbuttock to form Brocklesby-Burrumbuttock following 2005 season |
| Boree Creek | | Magpies | Boree Creak Recreation Reserve, Boree Creek | CRFL | 1886 | 1970–1975 | 0 | – | Recess in 1976, re-formed in Coreen & District FL in 1977 |
| Burrumbuttock | | Swans | Burrumbuttock Recreation Reserve, Burrumbuttock | CHFA | 1911 | 1934-2005 | 2 | 1951, 1969 | Merged with Brocklesby to form Brocklesby-Burrumbuttock following 2005 season |
| Coleambally | | Blues | Coleambally Sports Grounds, Coleambally | C&DFL | 1965 | 2008-2010 | 0 | – | Moved to Farrer FL after 2010 season. |
| Corowa Juniors | | Bombers | John Foord Oval, Corowa | | | | 0 | – | Only played in junior grades. |
| East Albury Rovers | | Rovers | | A&DFL | 1947 | 1948–1950 | 0 | – | Merged with North Albury 2nds following 1950 season. |
| East Lavington | | Saints | Urana Road Oval, Lavington | – | 1977 | 1977–1997 | 2 | 1979, 1988 | Folded after 1997 season |
| Gerogery | | | Gerogery Recreation Ground, Gerogery | CHFA | 1903 | 1933–1947 | 4 | 1933, 1934, 1935, 1936 | Folded after 1947 season |
| Lavington | Dark with light band (1933–40) | Saints | Urana Road Oval, Lavington | FFL | 1918 | 1933–1940, 1975–1976 | 1 | 1938 | Moved to Chiltern & District FA following 1940 season. Moved to Farrer FL after 1976 season |
| North Albury Seconds | | Hoppers | Bunton Park, North Albury | – | 1937 | 1951–1952 | 0 | – | Moved to Ovens & Murray FL Seconds after 1952 season |
| Rand | | Pigeons | Rand Recreation Reserve, Rand | A&DFL | 1925 | 1945–1983 | 1 | 1945 | Moved to Coreen & District FL after 1983 season |
| Rand-Walbundrie | | Tigers | Rand Recreation Reserve, Rand and Walbundrie Showground, Walbundrie | – | 2006 | 2006-2015 | 0 | – | Merged with Walla Walla to form Rand-Walbundrie-Walla following 2005 season |
| Rennie | | Hoppers | Rennie Recreation Reserve, Rennie | C&DFL | 1932 | 2008 | 0 | – | Moved to Picola & District FNL after 2008 season |
| St Paul's College, Walla Walla | | | | – | 1948 | 1950–1985 | 8 | 3rds: 1950, 1961, 1963, 1967, 1972, 1975, 1976, 1978. | Junior football club (thirds only). Folded after 1985 season. |
| Wagga Road | | | Trained at Albury Showgrounds, played at Lavington Recreation Reserve, Lavington | – | 1936 | 1936–1938 | 0 | – | Folded after 1938 season |
| Walbundrie | (1934-?, 1968)(1952)(?-2005) | Tigers | Walbundrie Showground, Walbundrie | CHFA | 1906 | 1934-2005 | 8 | 1937, 1947, 1949, 1952, 1967, 1968, 1978, 1989 | Merged with Rand to form Rand-Walbundrie following 2005 season |
| Walla Walla | (1935-?)(?-2015 | Hoppers | Walla Walla Sportsground, Walla Walla | CHFA | 1903 | 1935-2015 | 15 | 1939, 1940, 1948, 1953, 1959, 1965, 1966, 1970, 1973, 1974, 1976, 1980, 1981, 1983, 1987 | Merged with Rand-Walbundrie to form Rand-Walbundrie-Walla following 2005 season |

== Premierships: Football ==
=== Seniors ===
- 1933: Gerogery
- 1934: Gerogery
- 1935: Gerogery
- 1936: Gerogery
- 1937: Walbundrie
- 1938: Lavington
- 1939: Walla Walla
- 1940: Walla Walla
- 1941–44: In recess>World War II
- 1945: Rand
- 1946: Jindera
- 1947: Walbundrie
- 1948: Walla Walla
- 1949: Walbundrie
- 1950: Brocklesby
- 1951: Burrumbuttock
- 1952: Walbundrie
- 1953: Walla Walla
- 1954: Howlong *
- 1955: Jindera
- 1956: Jindera
- 1957: Jindera
- 1958: Brocklesby
- 1959: Walla Walla
- 1960: Jindera
- 1961: Jindera
- 1962: Balldale
- 1963: Jindera
- 1964: Jindera
- 1965: Walla Walla
- 1966: Walla Walla
- 1967: Walbundrie
- 1968: Walbundrie
- 1969: Burrumbuttock
- 1970: Walla Walla
- 1971: Howlong
- 1972: Balldale *
- 1973: Walla Walla
- 1974: Walla Walla
- 1975: Jindera
- 1976: Walla Walla
- 1977: Howlong
- 1978: Walbundrie
- 1979: East Lavington
- 1980: Walla Walla
- 1981: Walla Walla
- 1982: Lockhart
- 1983: Walla Walla
- 1984: Henty *
- 1985: Osborne
- 1986: Henty
- 1987: Walla Walla
- 1988: East Lavington
- 1989: Walbundrie
- 1990: Henty
- 1991: Osborne
- 1992: Osborne
- 1993: Culcairn
- 1994: Osborne
- 1995: Osborne
- 1996: Henty
- 1997: Howlong
- 1998: Osborne
- 1999: Osborne
- 2000: Osborne
- 2001: Osborne
- 2002: Howlong
- 2003: Lockhart
- 2004: Holbrook
- 2005: Osborne
- 2006: Osborne
- 2007: Culcairn
- 2008: Jindera
- 2009: Osborne
- 2010: Howlong
- 2011: Jindera
- 2012: Osborne
- 2013: Brocklesby-Burrumbuttock
- 2014: Henty
- 2015: Brocklesby-Burrumbuttock
- 2016: Brocklesby-Burrumbuttock
- 2017: Osborne
- 2018: Brocklesby-Burrumbuttock
- 2019: Osborne
- 2020: In recess > COVID-19
- 2021: No finals > COVID-19
- 2022: Holbrook
- 2023: Osborne
- 2024: Osborne
- 2025: Osborne
- 2026: Henty

(1954: * Howlong: undefeated. 1972: * Balldale: undefeated. 1984: * Henty: undefeated.)

=== Reserves ===
- 1976: Jindera
- 1977: East Lavington
- 1978: East Lavington
- 1979: Walla Walla
- 1980: Walbundrie
- 1981: Henty
- 1982: Jindera
- 1983: Brocklesby
- 1984: East Lavington
- 1985: Jindera
- 1986: Henty
- 1987: Jindera
- 1988: East Lavington
- 1989: East Lavington
- 1990: East Lavington
- 1991: Walbundrie
- 1992: Walla Walla
- 1993: Culcairn
- 1994: Walla Walla
- 1995: Burrumbuttock
- 1996: Culcairn
- 1997: Walla Walla
- 1998: Osborne
- 1999: Lockhart
- 2000: Holbrook
- 2001: Jindera
- 2002: Osborne
- 2003: Osborne
- 2004: Osborne
- 2005: Osborne
- 2006: Lockhart
- 2007: Osborne
- 2008: Osborne
- 2009: Culcairn
- 2010: Culcairn
- 2011: Jindera
- 2012: Howlong
- 2013: Jindera
- 2014: Brocklesby-Burrumbuttock
- 2015: Henty
- 2016: Osborne
- 2017: Jindera
- 2018: Rand-Walbundrie-Walla
- 2019: Brocklesby-Burrumbuttock
- 2020: In recess > COVID-19
- 2021: No finals > COVID-19
- 2022: Holbrook
- 2023: Osborne
- 2024: Holbrook
- 2025: Osborne
- 2026: Osborne

=== Hume Junior Football League – 1950 to 1975 (Under 19's) ===
- 1950: St Paul's College
- 1951: Walla Walla
- 1952: Walla Walla
- 1953: Walla Walla
- 1954: Howlong
- 1955: Howlong
- 1956: Howlong
- 1957: Howlong
- 1958: Howlong
- 1959: Howlong
- 1960: Jindera
- 1961: St Paul's College
- 1962: Corowa
- 1963: St Paul's College
- 1964: Walla Walla
- 1965: Walla Walla
- 1966: Rand
- 1967: St Paul's College
- 1968: Walbundrie
- 1969: Jindera
- 1970: Walla Walla
- 1971: Walla Walla
- 1972: St. Paul's College
- 1973: Walla Walla
- 1974: Walla Walla
- 1975: St. Paul's College

=== Hume FL Thirds – 1976 to present day ===
- 1976: St. Paul's College
- 1977: East Lavington
- 1978: St. Paul's College
- 1979: Wabundrie
- 1980: Henty
- 1981: Henty
- 1982: Henty
- 1983: Henty
- 1984: Walla Walla
- 1985: Osborne
- 1986: Henty
- 1987: Osborne
- 1988: Walla Walla
- 1989: Walla Walla
- 1990: Walla Walla
- 1991: Walla Walla
- 1992: Henty
- 1993: Lockhart
- 1994: Lockhart
- 1995: Walla Walla
- 1996: Walla Walla
- 1997: Walla Walla
- 1998: Walla Walla
- 1999: Howlong
- 2000: Culcairn
- 2001: Henty
- 2002: Henty
- 2003: Henty
- 2004: Henty
- 2005: Osborne
- 2006: Culcairn
- 2007: Culcairn
- 2008: Murray Magpies
- 2009: Jindera
- 2010: Holbrook
- 2011: Brocklesby-Burrumbuttock
- 2012: Rand-Walbundrie
- 2013: Osborne
- 2014: Osborne
- 2015: Osborne
- 2016: Henty
- 2017: Brocklesby-Burrumbuttock
- 2018: Osborne
- 2019: Holbrook
- 2020: In recess > COVID-19
- 2021: No finals > COVID-19
- 2022: Rand-Walbundrie-Walla
- 2023: Henty
- 2024: Howlong
- 2025: Henty
- 2026: Howlong

=== Fourths ===
- 1990: Lockhart
- 1991: Lockhart
- 1992: Lockhart
- 1993: Walbundrie
- 1994: Walla Walla
- 1995: Walla Walla
- 1996: Osborne
- 1997: Osborne
- 1998: Brocklesby
- 1999: Holbrook
- 2000: Lockhart
- 2001: Henty
- 2002: Lockhart
- 2003: Osborne
- 2004: Howlong
- 2005: Holbrook
- 2006: Henty
- 2007: Holbrook
- 2008: Holbrook
- 2009: Howlong
- 2010: Rand-Walbundrie
- 2011: Osborne
- 2012: Osborne
- 2013: Osborne
- 2014: Coreen-Daysdale-Hopefield-Buraja United
- 2015: Henty
- 2016: Holbrook
- 2017: Osborne
- 2018: Rand-Walbundrie-Walla
- 2019: Osborne
- 2020: In recess > COVID-19
- 2021: No finals > COVID-19
- 2022: Henty
- 2023: Lockhart
- 2024: Lockhart
- 2025: Holbrook
- 2026: Osborne

== Premiership Table ==
Hume FL – Seniors / Grand Final participants

| Club | Premierships | Runners Up | Draws | Total |
|---|---|---|---|---|
| Osborne | 18 | 9 | | 27 |
| Walla Walla | 15 | 10 | | 25 |
| Jindera | 11 | 15 | | 26 |
| Walbundrie | 8 | 10 | | 18 |
| Howlong | 6 | 3 | | 9 |
| Henty | 6 | 5 | | 11 |
| Brocklesby-Burrumbuttock | 4 | 1 | | 5 |
| Gerogery | 4 | 0 | | 4 |
| Brocklesby | 2 | 6 | | 8 |
| Holbrook | 2 | 8 | | 10 |
| Culcairn | 2 | 5 | | 7 |
| Burrumbuttock | 2 | 4 | | 6 |
| Balldale | 2 | 3 | | 5 |
| East Lavington | 2 | 1 | | 3 |
| Lockhart | 2 | 1 | | 3 |
| Rand | 1 | 4 | | 5 |
| Lavington | 1 | 2 | | 3 |
| Bethanga | 0 | 1 | | 1 |
| RWW Giants | 0 | 1 | | 1 |
| TOTAL | 89 | 89 | | 178 |

Notes - As of 20 September 2026

== Football – Grand Final Results ==
The Hume Football League grand final has been played at Walbundrie since 1976.

The senior football premiership captain receives the Bert Webb Memorial Trophy, in honour of former Hume FL president from 1959 to 1975.

The Hume Football League senior football grand final has presented the Des Kennedy Memorial Medal to the player judged best on ground since 1999.

Des Kennedy (OAM) was the Hume FL Secretary / Treasurer from 1962 until his unexpected death in 1992, while serving his 31st consecutive year as secretary.

Highest score in a preliminary final was in 1971 – Walbundrie: 29.21 – 195 defeated Jindera: 8.11 – 59.

Seniors

| Year | Premiers | Score | Runners up | Score | Best on Ground | Venue | Gate/Comments |
|---|---|---|---|---|---|---|---|
| 1933 | Gerogery | 14.14 – 98 | Jindera | 5.10 – 40 | | Lavington | |
| 1934 | Gerogery | 9.6 – 60 | Lavington | 8.8 – 56 | | Jindera | |
| 1935 | Gerogery | 9.14 – 68 | Walbundrie | 8.15 – 63 | | Jindera | £30 |
| 1936 | Gerogery | 10.10 – 70 | Walbundrie | 5.10 – 40 | | Jindera | £48 |
| 1937 | Walbundrie | 11.9 – 75 | Walla Walla | 2.8 – 20 | | Jindera | £47 |
| 1938 | Lavington | 17.23 – 125 | Bethanga | 5.6 – 36 | | Jindera | £57/10/ |
| 1939 | Walla Walla | 10.9 – 69 | Lavington | 4.7 – 31 | | Burrumbottock | £39 |
| 1940 | Walla Walla | 15.19 – 109 | Walbundrie | 6.7 – 43 | | Jindera | £13/6 |
| 1941–44 | | | | | | | In recess: World War II |
| 1945 | Rand | 6.7 – 43 | Walla Walla | 4.6 – 30 | | Walbundrie | |
| 1946 | Jindera | 5.13 – 43 | Rand | 5.12 – 42 | | Walla | £113/10 |
| 1947 | Walbundrie | 13.9 – 87 | Jindera | 10.9 – 69 | | Brocklesby | £100 |
| 1948 | Walla Walla | 13.20 – 98 | Rand | 8.10 – 58 | | Brocklesby | |
| 1949 | Walbundrie | 10.13 – 73 | Brocklesby | 5.10 – 40 | | Walla Walla | |
| 1950 | Brocklesby | 15.6 – 96 | Jindera | 11.10 – 76 | | Burrumbottock | |
| 1951 | Burrumbottock | 12.7 – 79 | Walla Walla | 10.17 – 77 | | Brocklesby | |
| 1952 | Walbundrie | 8.11 – 59 | Burrumbottock | 6.6 – 42 | | Walla Walla | |
| 1953 | Walla Walla | 13.10 – 88 | Brocklesby | 4.6 – 30 | | Burrumbuttock | £362 |
| 1954 | Howlong | 9.16 – 70 | Walbundrie | 9.15 – 69 | | Brocklesby | £442 – HFC: undefeated premiers |
| 1955 | Jindera | 14.12 – 96 | Balldale | 9.7 – 61 | | | £592 |
| 1956 | Jindera | 11.12 – 78 | Balldale | 10.13 – 73 | | | £326 |
| 1957 | Jindera | 19.15 – 129 | Walla Walla | 3.5 – 23 | | | £600 - JFC: undefeated premiers |
| 1958 | Brocklesby | 14.7 – 91 | Walla Walla | 13.8 – 86 | | | £626 |
| 1959 | Walla Walla | 18.20 – 128 | Walbundrie | 14.9 – 93 | | | £620 |
| 1960 | Jindera | 13.20 – 98 | Rand | 5.10 – 40 | | | £610 |
| 1961 | Jindera | 10.8 – 68 | Balldale | 9.7 – 61 | | | £566 |
| 1962 | Balldale | 8.21 – 69 | Jindera | 5.8 – 38 | | | £706 |
| 1963 | Jindera | 11.16 – 82 | Walla Walla | 11.15 – 81 | | | £938 |
| 1964 | Jindera | 11.13 – 79 | Rand | 7.9 – 51 | | | £414 - JFC: undefeated premiers |
| 1965 | Walla Walla | 24.13 – 157 | Jindera | 14.16 – 100 | | | 846 |
| 1966 | Walla Walla | 10.15 – 75 | Walbundrie | 8.14 – 62 | | | $733 |
| 1967 | Walbundrie | 17.15 – 117 | Jindera | 13.17 – 95 | | | $809 |
| 1968 | Walbundrie | 17.9 – 111 | Jindera | 10.10 – 70 | | | $647 |
| 1969 | Burrumbottock | 15.11 – 101 | Howlong | 11.8 – 74 | | | $795 |
| 1970 | Walla Walla | 13.12 – 90 | Walbundrie | 12.17 – 89 | | | $783 |
| 1971 | Howlong | 15.24 – 114 | Walbundrie | 12.10 – 82 | | | $851 |
| 1972 | Balldale | 14.17 – 101 | Walla Walla | 14.12 – 96 | | | $945: undefeated premiers |
| 1973 | Walla Walla | 9.14 – 68 | Burrumbottock | 10.7 – 67 | | | $980 |
| 1974 | Walla Walla | 16.14 – 110 | Jindera | 10.4 – 64 | | Walbundrie | $1312 |
| 1975 | Jindera | 13.11 – 89 | Walla Walla | 9.18 – 72 | | | $1315 |
| 1976 | Walla Walla | 12.16 – 88 | Brocklesby | 5.11 – 41 | | Walbundrie | $2010 |
| 1977 | Howlong | 11.15 – 81 | Burrumbottock | 7.12 – 54 | | Walbundrie | $2025 |
| 1978 | Walbundrie | 16.17 – 113 | Walla Walla | 15.14 – 104 | | Walbundrie | $2469 |
| 1979 | East Lavington | 12.13 – 85 | Burrumbottock | 11.15 – 81 | | Walbundrie | $2629 |
| 1980 | Walla Walla | 21.8 – 134 | Brocklesby | 12.16 – 88 | | Walbundrie | $3662 |
| 1981 | Walla Walla | 11.14 – 80 | Osborne | 8.10 – 58 | | Walbundrie | $4198 |
| 1982 | Lockhart | 13.17 – 95 | Henty | 7.6 – 48 | | Walbundrie | $4295 |
| 1983 | Walla Walla | 22.11 – 143 | Brocklesby | 14.22 – 106 | | Walbundrie | $6961 |
| 1984 | Henty | 15.16 – 106 | Brocklesby | 12.12 – 84 | | Walbundrie | $8202. HFC undefeated premiers |
| 1985 | Osborne | 16.11 – 107 | Henty | 13.10 – 88 | | Walbundrie | $8791 |
| 1986 | Henty | 18.11 – 119 | Jindera | 13.11 – 89 | | Walbundrie | |
| 1987 | Walla Walla | 12.21 – 93 | Jindera | 13.10 – 88 | | Walbundrie | |
| 1988 | East Lavington | 15.16 – 106 | Walbundrie | 12.13 0 85 | | Walbundrie | |
| 1989 | Walbundrie | 17.7 – 109 | East Lavington | 9.17 – 71 | | East Lavington | $4015 |
| 1990 | Henty | 21.10 – 136 | Jindera | 19.13 – 127 | | Walbundrie | |
| 1991 | Osborne | 8.12 – 60 | Walbundrie | 7.10 – 52 | | Walbundrie | $11,500 |
| 1992 | Osborne | 14.14 – 98 | Culcairn | 9.14 – 68 | | Walbundrie | $7944 |
| 1993 | Culcairn | 22.16 – 148 | Osborne | 14.10 – 94 | | Walbundrie | $11,000 |
| 1994 | Osborne | 24.18 – 162 | Culcairn | 12.10 – 82 | | Walbundrie | $12,500 |
| 1995 | Osborne | 18.11 – 119 | Culcairn | 12.8 – 80 | | Walbundrie | |
| 1996 | Henty | 18.16 – 124 | Walla Walla | 10.13 – 73 | | Walbundrie | |
| 1997 | Howlong | 10.9 – 69 | Osborne | 8.9 – 57 | | Walbundrie | $18,240 |
| 1998 | Osborne | 16.14 – 110 | Henty | 3.12 – 30 | | Walbundrie | $14,200 |
Best on ground: Des Kennedy Medal
| 1999 | Osborne | 10.9 – 69 | Lockhart | 10.8 – 68 | Gavin Graetz (O) | Walbundrie | $16,670 |
| 2000 | Osborne | 20.11 – 131 | Howlong | 7.9 – 51 | Craig Smith (O) | Walbundrie | $19,500 |
| 2001 | Osborne | 22.21 – 153 | Holbrook | 10.8 – 68 | Adam Schneider (O) | Walbundrie | $19,762 |
| 2002 | Howlong | 18.6 – 114 | Osborne | 13.13 – 91 | Ben Cain (H) | Walbundrie | $18,582 |
| 2003 | Lockhart | 19.12 – 126 | Holbrook | 13.6 – 84 | Josh Firman (L) | Walbundrie | |
| 2004 | Holbrook | 14.9 – 93 | Osborne | 9.11 – 65 | Marc Duryea (H) | Walbundrie | $18,729 |
| 2005 | Osborne | 12.15 – 93 | Culcairn | 8.5 – 53 | Owen Gooden (O) | Walbundrie | $19,500 |
| 2006 | Osborne | 14.11 – 95 | Howlong | 13.8 – 86 | Anthony Armstrong (O) | Walbundrie | $24,960 |
| 2007 | Culcairn | 15.8 – 98 | Osborne | 12.12 – 84 | Jayden Kotzur (C) | Walbundrie | $27,530 |
| 2008 | Jindera | 20.11 – 131 | Osborne | 12.8 – 80 | Ben Ryan (J) | Walbundrie | $33,783 |
| 2009 | Osborne | 15.16 – 106 | Jindera | 9.14 – 68 | Djali Bloomfield (O) | Walbundrie | $33,117 |
| 2010 | Howlong | 15.7 – 97 | Culcairn | 10.9 – 69 | Seven Fourace (H) | Walbundrie | $38,492 |
| 2011 | Jindera | 16.14 – 110 | Holbrook | 12.8 – 80 | Brett Garland (J) | Walbundrie | $45,988 |
| 2012 | Osborne | 15.12 – 102 | Henty | 11.5 – 71 | Rory Muggiven (O) | Walbundrie | $36,000 |
| 2013 | Brock-Burrum | 18.8 – 116 | Holbrook | 13.8 – 86 | Kylin Morey (BB) | Walbundrie | $45,625 |
| 2014 | Henty | 16.16 – 112 | RWW Giants | 10.7 – 67 | Heath Ohlin (H) | Walbundrie | $48,535 |
| 2015 | Brock-Burrum | 14.10 – 94 | Henty | 12.8 – 80 | Luke Schlig (BB) | Walbundrie | $44,020 |
| 2016 | Brock-Burrum | 13.8 – 86 | Jindera | 8.5 – 53 | Kylin Morey (BB) | Walbundrie | $48,402 |
| 2017 | Osborne | 9.12 – 66 | Jindera | 5.11 – 41 | Jamie Parr (O) | Walbundrie | $44,681 |
| 2018 | Brock-Burrum | 15.19 – 109 | Jindera | 8.11 – 59 | Matt Seiter (BB) | Walbundrie | $44,931 |
| 2019 | Osborne | 11.6 – 72 | Brock-Burrum | 5.6 – 36 | Martin Bahr (O) | Walbundrie | |
| 2020 | | | | | | | In recess > COVID-19 |
| 2021 | 1st: Osborne | | 2nd: Holbrook | | | | No finals > COVID-19 |
| 2022 | Holbrook | 11.13 – 79 | Osborne | 7.8 – 50 | John Mitchell (H) | Walbundrie | $49,000 |
| 2023 | Osborne | 15.16 – 106 | Holbrook | 8.8 – 56 | Hayden Armstrong (O) | Walbundrie | $55,000 |
| 2024 | Osborne | 9.9 – 63 | Holbrook | 4.10 – 34 | Duncan McMaster (O) | Walbundrie | |
| 2025 | Osborne | 12.9 - 81 | Holbrook | 7.14 - 56 | Connor Galvin (O) | Walbundrie | |
| 2026 | Henty | 11.4 - 70 | Osborne | 10.4 - 64 | Zac Klemke (H) | Walbundrie | |
| 2027 | | | | | | | |
| Year | Premier | Score | Runner Up | Score | Best on Ground | Venue | Gate/Comments |

== Best & Fairest / Leading Goalkicker Awards ==
It appears that there was no best and fairest award in the Hume Football League in 1933, then in 1934, the Hume Football League Patron and Jindera FC delegate, Mr Watson Robinson of the Jindera Hotel donated the best and fairest medal, which was won by Harold McIntosh from the Lavington Football Club.

The Loftus (best and fairest) Medal was first awarded in the Central Hume Football Association in 1933 and 1934 and when the Central Hume FA folded after the 1934 season, Mr Richard Vincent Loftus who was the licensee of the Walbundrie Hotel decided to continue to donate the award in 1935 for the first and only time in the Hume Football League.

In January 1936, Mr Joseph Nicholas Langtry took over as the licensee of the Walbundrie Hotel and Mr J Langtry (Walbundrie Delegate) offered to donate a medal at the AGM, for the league's best and fairest award.

In 1938, Mr. Albert Edward Giddens from the Walbundrie Hotel donated the medal, then in 1939, Mr. Andrew John Lonie who took over the Walbundrie Hotel, donated the best and fairest medal.

When Balldale FC re-joined the Hume Football League in 1947, Mr. Kelly Joseph Azzi then donated the best and fairest award medal in the Hume Football League and the award has remained as the Azzi Medal ever since.

Mr. Azzi initially donated the Chiltern & District Football Association best and fairest award in 1939 when Mr. Azzi was the Balldale FC Delegate and C&DFA Vice President.

Howlong brothers, Peter, Jack and Terry O'Halloran have all won Azzi Medals.

In 1991, the Hume FL decided to award retrospective Azzi Medals to the following players who also polled the same number of votes as the original winner (tied), but finished second in the award to the player who polled the most three votes, under the old countback system.

- 1966 – Barry Lambert (Jindera)
- 1967 – Barry Matthews (Rand)
- 1982 – Graeme Johnstone (Lockhart)
- 1988 – Robert O'Connell (Osborne)

Matt Seiter polled a record 36 votes in the 2019 Azzi Medal count, eclipsing the previous record of 34 votes, by Howlong's Jack O'Halloran in 1971. Interestingly, O'Halloran won two Ovens & Murray Football League Morris Medals in 1975 and 1976, while Seiter won the Morris Medal in 2016.

Multiple Best and Fairest Winners

- 3 – Terry O'Halloran (Howlong): 1983, 1988, 1989.
- 3 – Noel Coutts (Holbrook): 2002, 2003, 2004.
- 2 – Clyde Scholz (Jindera):1939, 1940.
- 2 – Merv Wegener (Walla Walla): 1961, 1964.
- 2 – David Schlig (Burrumbottock): 1986, 1991.
- 2 – Rob O'Connell (Osborne): 1988, 1990.
- 2 – Stephen Clarke (Osborne): 2000, 2001.
- 2 - Brent Barber (Walbundrie) 2004 & (Culcairn) 2007
- 2 – Peter Hancock: (Howlong): 2013, 2016.

=== Seniors ===
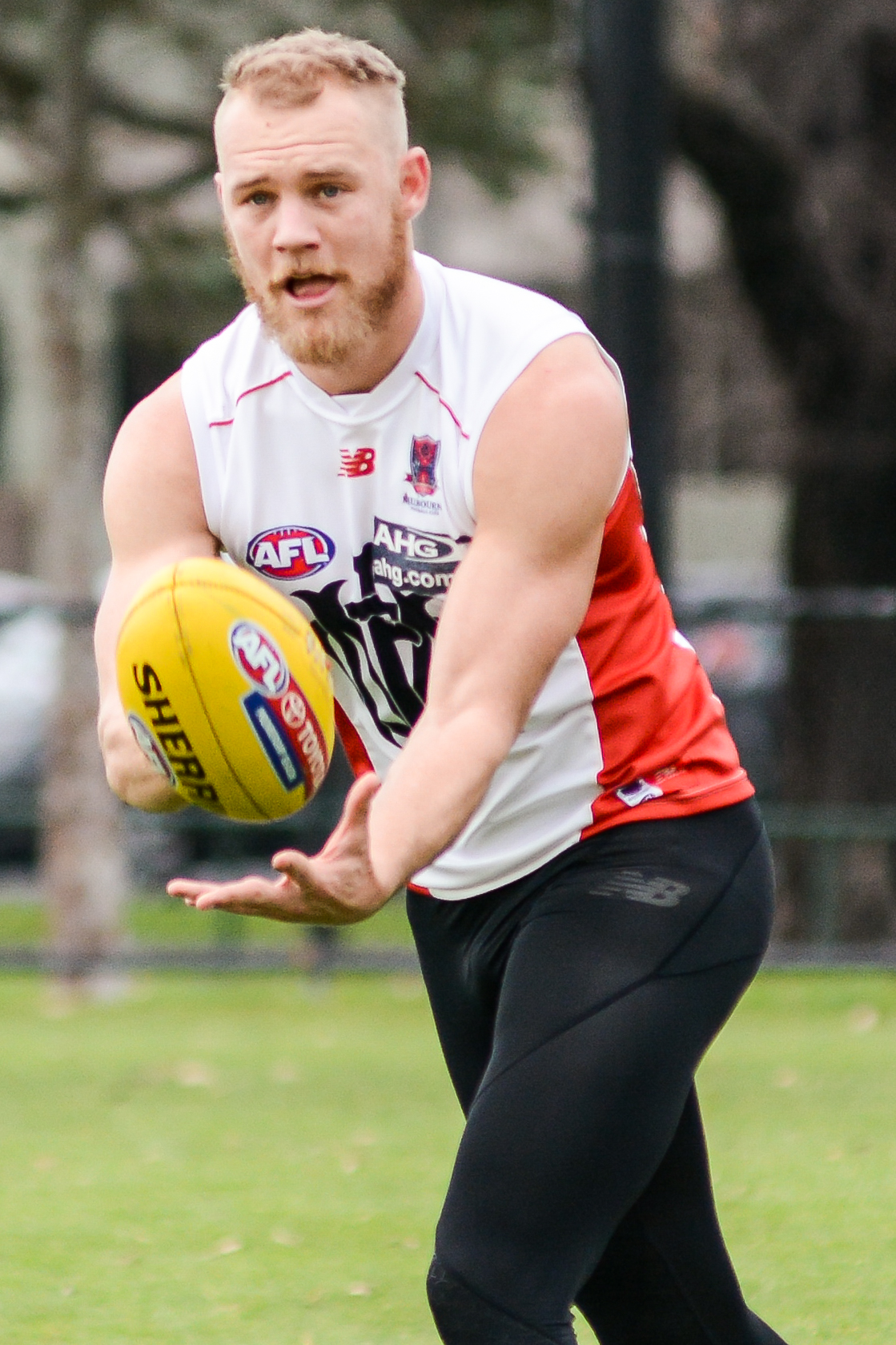
Dean Terlich, 2015

| | Hume FNL SENIORS – Best & Fairest: Azzi Family Medal / Leading Goalkicker | | | | | |
| Year | Winner | Club | Votes | Goalkicking | Club | Goals |
|---|---|---|---|---|---|---|
| 1933 | No B&F Award? | | | | | |
W Robinson Medal (Jindera Hotel)
| 1934 | Harold McIntosh | Lavington | 21 | | | |
R V Loftus Medal (Walbundrie Hotel)
| 1935 | Wally Hall | Burrumbottock | 25 | | | |
J N Langtry Medal (Walbundrie Hotel)
| 1936 | Harold Bakes | Gerogery | | | | |
| 1937 | Roy Schmidt | Walla Walla | | | | |
A E Giddens Medal (Walbundrie Hotel)
| 1938 | Tom Fagan | Walbundrie | 29&1/2 | | | |
A J Lonie Medal (Walbundrie Hotel)
| 1939 | Clyde Scholz | Jindera | | | | |
| 1940 | Clyde Scholz | Jindera | 19 | | | |
1941 to 1944: Hume FL in recess > World War II
| 1945 | No B & F Award? | | | | | |
| 1946 | No B & F Award? | | | Joe Williams | Rand | 88 |
Kelly J. Azzi Medal
| 1947 | Les Braunach | Jindera | 19 | J Wood | Jindera | 63 |
| 1948 | Norm Benstead & | Jindera | 22 | | | |
| | Kevin Doyle | Rand | 22 | | | |
| 1949 | Dudley Probyn | Brocklesby | 24 | Les Voss | Walbundrie | 60 |
| 1950 | Vern Gilcrist | Walla Walla | 20 | Les Voss | Walbundrie | 42 |
| 1951 | Harold Thomson | Walla Walla | 15 | | | |
| 1952 | Ossie Bownds | Burrumbottock | 18 | | | |
| 1953 | Kevin Minogue | Brocklesby | 25 | Ray Watkins | Burrumbuttock | 52 |
| 1954 | Keith Murray | Walla Walla | 23 | Geoff Grace | Howlong | 118 |
| 1955 | Norm Webb | Jindera | 29 | Geoff Grace | Howlong | 76 |
| 1956 | Billy King | Howlong | | Geoff Grace | Howlong | 46 |
| 1957 | Jim Kiley & | Howlong | | Bill Moon | Burrumbuttock | 66 |
| | Barry Obst | Brocklesby | | | | |
| 1958 | Des Dower & | Howlong | | Don Spencer | Brocklesby | 55 |
| | Bill Thomas | Walbundrie | | | | |
| 1959 | Lance Boswell | Howlong | | Barry Gibbons | Walbundrie | 48 |
| 1960 | Jim Lalor | Howlong | | Peter Bartsch | Rand | 56 |
| 1961 | Merv Wegener | Walla Walla | | Barry Matthews | Rand | 42 |
| 1962 | Ken Lindner | Burrumbottock | | Ben Lalor | Howlong | 36 |
| 1963 | Dick Prior | Balldale | 19 | John Jacob | Walla Walla | 41 |
| 1964 | Merv Wegener | Walla Walla | 19 | Bill Barton | Jindera | 61 |
| 1965 | Peter O'Halloran | Howlong | | John Jacob | Walla Walla | 72 |
| 1966 | Lindsay Jacob & | Walla Walla | 19 | Roy Batson | Howlong | 52 |
| | Barry Lambert* | Jindera | 19 | | | |
| 1967 | Rob Batson & | Howlong | 17 | Brian McMahon | Howlong | 43 |
| | Barry Matthews* | Rand | 17 | | | |
| 1968 | Max Eyers | Howlong | | John Prentice | Walbundrie | 39 |
| 1969 | Jimmy Anderson | Rand | | Jack O'Halloran | Howlong | 92 |
| 1970 | Fred Aliendi | Balldale | 24 | Colin Jacob | Walla Walla | 81 |
| 1971 | Jack O'Halloran | Howlong | 34 | Colin Klose | Brocklesby | 70 |
| 1972 | Garry Mickan | Walla Walla | 20 | 1st: Gary Mickan | Walla Walla | 108 |
| | | | | 2nd: Peter Matthews | Rand | 103 |
| 1973 | Geoff Wallace | Howlong | 26 | Peter Matthews | Rand | 106 |
| 1974 | Graeme Proctor | Howlong | 24 | John Prentice | Brocklesby | 76 |
| 1975 | Peter Kirkwood | Walbundrie | 22 | John Fowler | Walbundrie | 77 |
| 1976 | John Lappin & | Brocklesby | 14 | Gary Mickan | Walla Walla | 90 |
| | Mark Pfitzner | Walla Walla | 14 | | | |
| 1977 | Len Duffy | Walla Walla | 20 | Gary Mickan | Walla Walla | 105 |
| 1978 | Bob Parks | East Lavington | 18 | Ken Linder | Burrumbuttock | 71 |
| 1979 | Jack Danckert | Burrumbottock | | Bob Lloyd | Howlong | 81 |
| 1980 | Allan Scammell | Burrumbottock | | Bob Lloyd | Howlong | 81 |
| 1981 | Phil Godde | Walla Walla | | John Willoughby | Brocklesby | 96 |
| 1982 | Craig Lieschke & | Henty | | 1st: Warren Sykes | Lockhart | 133 |
| | Graham Johnstone* | Lockhart | | 2nd: Daryl Jordan | Jindera | 109 |
| | | | | 3rd: Rod Gulph | Osborne | 100 |
| 1983 | Terry O'Halloran | Howlong | | Warren Sykes | Lockhart | 117 |
| 1984 | Craig Lieschke | Henty | | Peter Gibbons | Brocklesby | 172 |
| 1985 | Dave Couslton | Walla Walla | | Peter Gibbons | Brocklesby | 139 |
| 1986 | David Schlig | Burrumbottock | | Peter Gibbons | Brocklesby | 82 |
| 1987 | Peter Clayton | Burrumbottock | | Peter Gibbons | Brocklesby | 108 |
| 1988 | Terry O'Halloran | Howlong | | 1st: Daryl Jordan | Walbundrie | 134 |
| | Rob O'Connell* | Osborne | | 2nd: Lloyd Burgmann | Osborne | 111 |
| 1989 | Terry O'Halloran | Howlong | | Daryl Jordan | Walbundrie | 153 |
| 1990 | Rob O'Connell | Osborne | 23 | Peter Murray | Henty | 123 |
| 1991 | David Schlig & | Burrumbottock | 16 | Max Perryman | Osborne | 83 |
| | Warren Sykes | Lockhart | 16 | | | |
| 1992 | Sean Nesbitt | Walbundrie | | Martin Garoni | Walbundrie | 97 |
| 1993 | Peter Copley | Culcairn | | Shannon Barber | Culcairn | 102 |
| 1994 | Steve Taylor | Brocklesby | 23 | 1st: Martin Garoni | Walbundrie | 122 |
| | | | | 2nd: L Hannon | Brocklesby | 103 |
| 1995 | Russell Smith | Osborne | | Glen Bench | Osborne | 100 |
| 1996 | Michael Killeen & | Culcairn | 18 | Steven Heterton | Henty | 111 |
| | Scott McGrath | Culcairn | 18 | | | |
| 1997 | Jim Sandrel Junior | Howlong | 26 | Glenn Bench | Osborne | 73 |
| 1998 | Shane Lenon | Lockhart | 32 | Michael Hewitt | Lockhart | 82 |
| 1999 | Paul Scoullor | Lockhart | 32 | 1st: Anthony Carroll | Lockhart | 121 |
| | | | | 2nd: Troy Hawkins | Jindera | 115 |
| | | | | 3rd: Mark Byrne | Holbrook | 104 |
| 2000 | Stephen Clarke | Osborne | 32 | 1st: Mark Byrne | Holbrook | 113 |
| | | | | 2nd: Jamie Macri | Howlong | 103 |
| 2001 | Stephen Clarke | Osborne | 23 | Mark Dicketts | Holbrook | 88 |
| 2002 | Noel Coutts & | Holbrook | 27 | Peter Maloney | Burrumbuttock | 79 |
| | Anthony Ross | Howlong | 27 | | | |
| 2003 | Noel Coutts | Holbrook | 32 | Matt Jones | Walbundrie | 81 |
| 2004 | Brent Barber & | Walbundrie | 20 | Dan Daley | Howlong | 82 |
| | Noel Coutts & | Holbrook | 20 | | | |
| | Clint Gilson | Walbundrie | 20 | | | |
| 2005 | Cal McClay | Osborne | 24 | Shaun Myles | Brocklesby | 103 |
| 2006 | Adam Hansen | Howlong | 27 | Shaun Myles | Howlong | 110 |
| 2007 | Brent Barber | Culcairn | 24 | Shaun Myles | Howlong | 113 |
| 2008 | Graeme Fruean | Culcairn | 24 | Mark Hilton | Jindera | 89 |
| 2009 | Nathan McPherson | Lockhart | 27 | Aaron Barnes | Howlong | 88 |
| 2010 | Trent Storey | Brock-Burrum | 24 | Aaron Barnes | Howlong | 69 |
| 2011 | Mikal Bloom | Holbrook | 25 | Darren Bradshaw | Howlong | 102? |
| 2012 | Jarmal O'Sullivan | Henty | 26 | Daniel Bradshaw | Howlong | 89 (105) |
| 2013 | Peter Hancock | Howlong | 24 | James Breen | Holbrook | 91 |
| 2014 | Nico Sedgewick | Brock-Burrum | 24 | Josh Warren | Rand-Walbundrie | 86 (96) |
| 2015 | Luke Schlig | Brock-Burrum | 24 | Ashley Murray | Murray Magpies | 106 (110) |
| 2016 | Peter Hancock | Howlong | 23 | Ashley Murray | Murray Magpies | 66 (69) |
| 2017 | Jamie Parr | Osborne | 21 | John Robbins | Culcairn | 63 (71) |
| 2018 | Steve Jolliffe | Howlong | 26 | 1st: Damian Cupido | Henty | 115 (121) |
| | | | | 2nd: Trent Castles | Jindera | 96 (111) |
| 2019 | Matt Seiter | Brock-Burrum | 36 | Adam Prior | Culcairn | 99 (103) |
| 2020 | Hume FNL in recess | COVID-19 | | | | |
| 2021 | Will Holmes | Holbrook | 27 | Shannon Terlich | Henty | 58 |
| 2022 | Hamish Clark | Howlong | 31 | Luke Gestier | Osborne | 77 (79) |
| 2023 | Abe Wooden | Lockhart | 28 | Trent Castles | Jindera | 71 |
| 2024 | Max Hillier | Osborne | 30 | Ryan Beveridge & | CDHBU | 58 (60) |
| | | | | Luke Gestier | Holbrook | 58 (60) |
| 2025 | Will Holmes | Holbrook | 28 | Ryan Beveridge | CDHBU | 70 (74) |
| 2026 | Max Hillier | Osborne | 26 | Frances Tipungwuti | Henty | 65 (68) |

- – () Brackets tally includes goals kicked in finals

=== Reserves ===
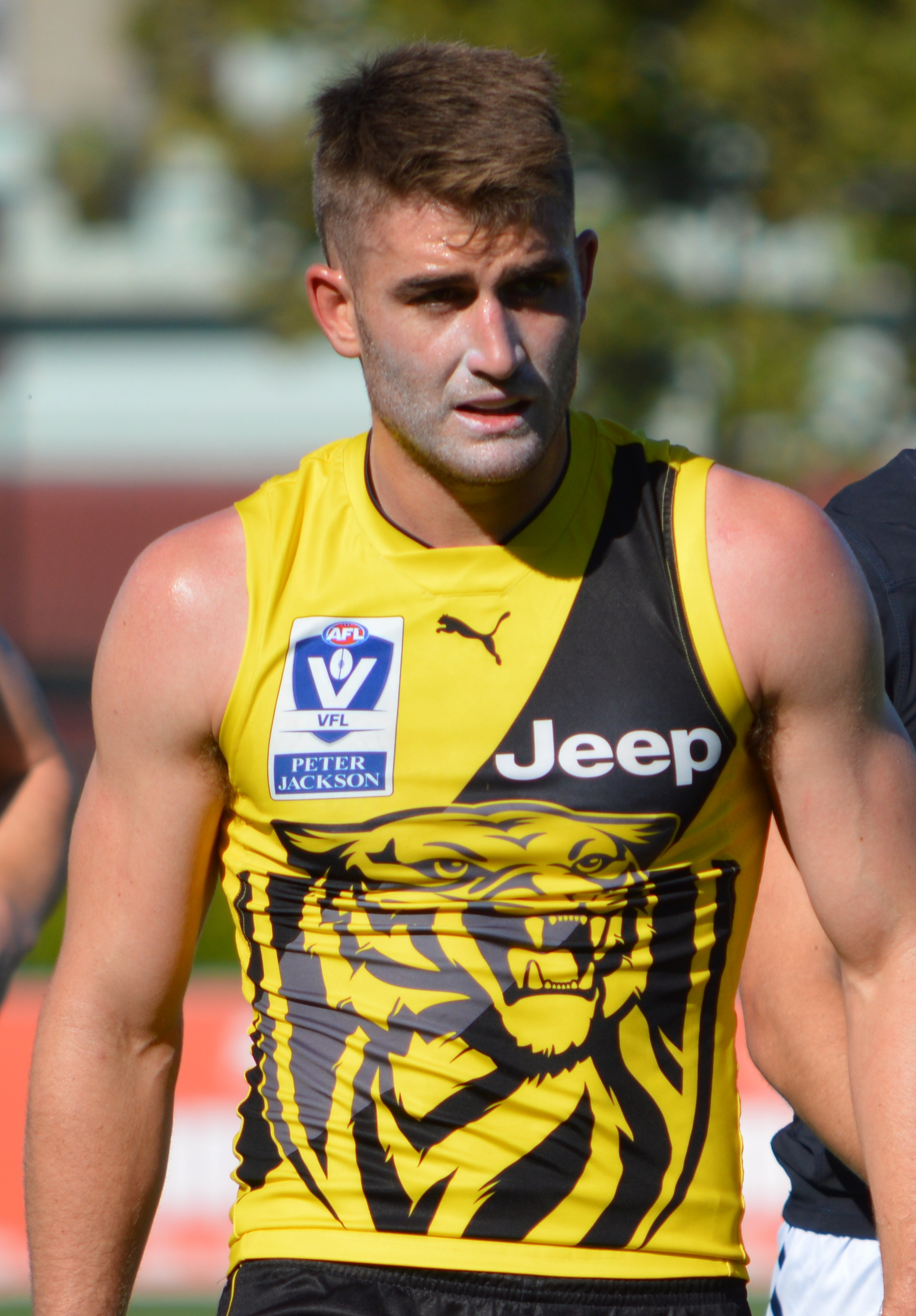
Anthony Miles

| | Hume FNL RESERVES: Best & Fairest – Bevan Odewahn Medal / Leading Goalkicker | | | | | |
| Year | Winner | Club | Votes | Goalkicking | Club | Goals |
|---|---|---|---|---|---|---|
| 1976 | Algy Arendarcikas | Jindera | 21 | Brian Gleeson | Jindera | 42 |
| 1977 | Algy Arendarcikas | Jindera | 23 | Dale Robinson | Jindera | 52 |
| 1978 | Bernie Burke | East Lavington | 16 | John Kidd | Howlong | 46 |
| 1979 | Kevin Bosse | Walla Walla | | John Kidd | Howlong | 52 |
| 1980 | Robin Briggs | Howlong | | John Kidd | Howlong | 46 |
| 1981 | Kevin Kilo | Henty | | Pat Kane | Henty | 47 |
| 1982 | Garry Koehler | Jindera | | Pat Kane | Henty | 51 |
| 1983 | Keith Smallwood | Osborne | | Geoff Hood | East Lavington | 41 |
| 1984 | Keith Smallwood & | Osborne | | John Fowler | Walbundrie | 46 |
| | Mick Twentyman | Osborne | | | | |
| 1985 | Peter Hyde | Lockhart | | Bill Cassidy | Burrumbuttock | 56 |
| 1986 | John Hefferman | Henty | | Roy Dahmes | Jindera | 33 |
| 1987 | Ian Jackson | Jindera | | Roy Parkes | Walla Walla | 71 |
| 1988 | John Blomley | Brocklesby | | Gordon Habermann | Walbundrie | 45 |
| 1989 | Gordon Edwards | Walbundre | | Gordon Habermann | Walbundrie | 74 |
| 1990 | Dale Mastenbroek | East Lavington | 26 | Noel Garlick | Walla Walla | 55 |
| 1991 | Dale Mastenbroek | East Lavington | | Gary Graetz | Walbundrie | 39 |
| 1992 | James King | Burrumbuttock | | Ashley Dyde | Culcairn | 62 |
| 1993 | Mark Kirkpatrick | Walla Walla | | Ashley Dyde | Culcairn | 91 |
| 1994 | Nick Bedggood | Henty | | David Hill | Walbundrie | 59 |
| 1995 | Drasko Kirsto | Burrumbuttock | | Lyle Burns | Burrumbuttock | 51 |
| 1996 | Andrew Morrison | Howlong | | Mark Morey | Burrumbuttock | 86 |
| 1997 | Steven Scott | Henty | | Ross Ellis | Walla Walla | 61 |
| 1998 | Greg Bullman | Walbundrie | 18 | Rod Enders | Osbornne | 51 |
| 1999 | Rhys Kelly | Lockhart | 22 | Luke Travaskis | Lockhart | 77 |
| 2000 | David Davaney | Jindera | 24 | Clinton Renner | Lockhart | 64 |
| 2001 | Joel Mackie | Jindera | 15 | Lyle Burns | Burrumbuttock | 57 |
| 2002 | Robbie Mackindlay | Holbrook | 25 | Brett Godde | Culcairn | 56 |
| 2003 | Daniel Black & | Holbrook | 14 | Ross Ellis | Walla Walla | 66 |
| | Jason Sinclair | Brocklesby | 14 | | | |
| 2004 | Jonathon Hoffman | Culcairn | 19 | Adam Sheather | Osborne | 75 |
| 2005 | David Davaney | Howlong | 27 | Todd Gunning | Osborne | 75 |
| 2006 | David Davaney | Howlong | 22 | Stuart Gray & | Howlong | 40 |
| | | | | A Johnstone | Brock-Burrum | 40 |
| 2007 | Neil Gowland | Osborne | 23 | Neale Terlich | Henty | 78 |
| 2008 | Michael Gleeson | Osborne | 24 | Trevor Callanan | Jindera | 65 |
| 2009 | Scott McGrath | Culcairn | 21 | Andrew Schmetzer | Osborne | 70 |
| 2010 | Matt Klemke | Culcairn | 16 | Adam I'Anson | Brock-Burrum | 68 |
| 2011 | Dale McFaull | Jindera | 23 | Justin Dodds | Holbrook | 82 |
| 2012 | Josh Oster | Walla Walla | 23 | Ryan Cannon | Howlong | 62 |
| 2013 | Ewen Scholz | Henty | 21 | Justin Dodds | Holbrook | 64 |
| 2014 | Sam Dewar | Jindera | 23 | Trevor Callanan | Jindera | 81 (86) |
| 2015 | Josh Firman | Lockhart | 31 | Nathan Woods | Magpies | 87 (91) |
| 2016 | Daniel Terlich | Henty | 21 | Bradley Lewis | CDHBU | 60 |
| 2017 | Michael Gleeson | Osborne | 21 | Adam I'Anson | Brock-Burrum | 68 (74) |
| 2018 | Zac Barrenechea | Brock-Burrum | 25 | Chris Barker | Howlong | 59 (63) |
| 2019 | Tim Seymour | Howlong | 22 | Adam I'Anson | Brock-Burrum | 58 |
| 2020 | Hume FL in recess | COVID-19 | | | | |
| 2021 | Daniel Heagney | Brock-Burrum | 15 | Sam Alexander | Osborne | 45 |
| 2022 | Joshua Lewis | CDHBU | 28 | Brad Lewis | CDHBU | 81 (85) |
| 2023 | Matthew Tullberg | Osborne | 24 | Sam Alexander | Osborne | 62 (63) |
| 2024 | B Ashley-James | Holbrook | 17 | Sam Alexander | Osborne | 61 |
| 2025 | Jacob Beveridge | CDHBU | 19 | Jake Coats | CDHBU | 51 (52) |
| 2026 | Jude Vennell | Lockhart | 26 | Tynan Wiesner Milham | Jindera | 60 (66) |
| 2027 | | | | | | |

- – () Brackets tally includes goals kicked in finals

=== Thirds / Under 17's ===
- Hume Junior Football League: 1950 to 1975. Under 19's from 1950 to ?
- Hume Football League Thirds: 1976 to 2025
- Bill Thomas Trophy was first awarded in 1972.
- Four best and fairest winners have gone onto play VFL / AFL seniors: Hilton Kotzur, Darren Holmes, Brent Piltz and Dean Terlich.

| | Hume FNL THIRDS: Best & Fairest: Bill Thomas Trophy / Leading Goalkicker | | | | | |
| Year | Winner | Club | Votes | Goalkicking | Club | Goals |
1950 to 1975: Hume Junior Football League
| 1950 | Colin Rohrlach | St. Paul's | | | | |
| 1951 | Brian Keighan | Jindera | | | | |
| 1952 | Noel Fielder | Jindera | | | | |
| 1953 | Alister Lieschke | St. Paul's | 20 | | | |
| 1954 | Geoff Wenke | St. Paul's | 22 | | | |
| 1955 | Elmore Lieschke | St. Paul's | | | | |
| 1956 | Graeme Thies | Howlong | | | | |
| 1957 | Leo Doyle | St. Paul's | | | | |
| 1958 | John Bishop | St. Paul's | | | | |
| 1959 | Ralph Wailes | Jindera | | | | |
| 1960 | Ross Rohrlach | St. Paul's | | | | |
| 1961 | Gary Frohling | Rand | | | | |
| 1962 | Ross Rohrlach | St. Paul's | | | | |
| 1963 | Ross Rohrlach | St. Paul's | | | | |
| 1964 | Joe Lynch | Jindera | | | | |
| 1965 | Rob Taylor | Rand | | | | |
| 1966 | Peter Bahr | St. Paul's | | | | |
| 1967 | Bruce Leah | Walla Walla | | | | |
| 1968 | Brian Lester | Howlong | | | | |
| 1969 | Gary Mickan | St. Paul's | | | | |
| 1970 | John Goode | Walla Walla | | | | |
| 1971 | David Downes | St. Paul's | | | | |
Hume JFL: Bill Thomas Trophy
| 1972 | Bernie Abbott | St. Paul's | 35 | | | |
| 1973 | Kim Maher | St. Paul's | 20 | | | |
| 1974 | Basil Coleman | St. Paul's | | | | |
| 1975 | Peter Lieschke | Walbundrie | | | | |
1976 to 2026: Hume Football League Thirds
| 1976 | Paul Hannigan | Jindera | 20 | ? | | |
| 1977 | Rob McIntosh | Walbundrie | | Kevin Noske | St. Paul's | ? |
| 1978 | Wayne Voss | Walbundrie | 23 | Kevin Noske | St. Paul's | 103 |
| 1979 | Hilton Kotzur | St. Paul's | | ? | | |
| 1980 | Phil Haskew | Howlong | | Kerry Bourke | Henty | 46 |
| 1981 | Phil Star | Walbundrie | | Phil Star | Walbundrie | 51 |
| 1982 | Bruce Duff | East Lavington | | Phil Takle | Henty | 71 |
| 1983 | Kerry Bahr | Walbundrie | | Scott Windsor | Henty | 63 |
| 1984 | Kerry Bahr | Walbundrie | | ? | | |
| 1985 | Darren Beddoes | Walla Walla | | David Burkinshaw | Lockhart | 82 |
| 1986 | Darren Holmes | Walla Walla | | Peter King | Lockhart | 48 |
| 1987 | Peter King | Lockhart | | ? | | |
| 1988 | Matthew Donovan | Walla Walla | | Mick Golden | Walla Walla | 31 |
| 1989 | Peter Murphy | Henty | | Glen Jones | Lockhart | 38 |
| 1990 | Sean Nesbitt | Walbundrie | | ? | | |
| 1991 | Nigel Smith | Lockhart | | Alister Broughan | Henty | 48 |
| 1992 | Glen Neilson | Lockhart | | Adam Klemke | Henty | 40 |
| 1993 | Bernard Odewahn | Culcairn | | Dean Mickan | Walla Walla | 48 |
| 1994 | Josh Firman | Lockhart | | ? | | |
| 1995 | Brent Piltz | Henty | | | | |
| 1996 | Leigh Schneider | Osborne | | | | |
| 1997 | Matthew Klemke | Henty | | | | |
| 1998 | Darren Penn | Howlong | 20 | | | |
| 1999 | Brendan Sheather | Culcairn | 23 | | | |
| 2000 | Mark Lazzarotto | Holbrook | 24 | | | |
| 2001 | David Trotter | Lockhart | 15 | | | |
| 2002 | Marcus Shaw | Holbrook | 31 | | | |
| 2003 | Jacob Wooden & | Lockhart | 15 | | | |
| | Grant Forrest | Henty | 15 | | | |
| 2004 | Damien Maloney | Henty | 20 | | | |
| 2005 | Dean Terlich | Osborne | 20 | | | |
| 2006 | Malcom Douglas | Osborne | 33 | | | |
| 2007 | Daniel Shaw | Holbrook | 37 | | | |
| 2008 | Matt McLellan | Holbrook | 31 | | | |
| 2009 | Derek Singe | Henty | 24 | Adam Schmidt | Jindera | 57 (60) |
| 2010 | Simon McLeish | Culcairn | 28 | Corey Smith | CDHBU | 60 |
| 2011 | Hamish Clark | Howlong | 29 | Alex Dickenson | CDHBU | 34 (36) |
| 2012 | Isaac Muller | Henty | 28 | Eric Wilkinson | Jindera | 70 (74) |
| 2013 | Ben Baker | Howlong | 37 | Jack Wynne | CDHBU | 57 (60) |
| 2014 | Nicholas Cooke | Culcairn | 29 | Chris Baggio | Howlong | 58 (63) |
| 2015 | Jacob Chant | Osborne | 29 | Chris Baggio | Howlong | 76 (81) |
| 2016 | Jessy Wilson | Howlong | 29 | Jamieson Bouffler | Lockhart | 47 (48) |
| 2017 | Mark Wettern & | Henty | 22 | Jamieson Bouffler | Lockhart | 36 (38) |
| | Rhys Mitsch | Brock-Burrum | 22 | | | |
| 2018 | Ty Voss | RWW Saints | 30 | Aidan Connell | Jindera | 42 (43) |
| 2019 | Ed O'Connell | Osborne | 28 | Dale Marsden | Osborne | 44 (45) |
| 2020 | In recess > | COVID-19 | | | | |
| 2021 | Noah Vennell | Lockhart | 33 | Jake Cooper | Jindera | 100 |
| 2022 | Zac Klemke | Henty | 25 | Ben Farrington | Howlong | 75 (79) |
| 2023 | Dominic Korzeniowski | Brock-Burrum | 32 | Billy Limbrick | CDHBU | 37 (40) |
| 2024 | Schirmer Izak | Holbrook | 27 | Ashton Scholz | Henty | 53 |
| 2025 | Hamish Livermore | Holbrook | 31 | Sam O'Leary | RWW Saints | 63 (68) |
| 2026 | Fletcher Way | Culcairn | 45 | Jett Murphy | Howlong | 60 (60) |
| Year | Winner | Club | Votes | Goalkicking | Club | Goals |

- – () Brackets tally includes goals kicked in finals

=== Fourths / Under 14's ===
| | Hume FNL FOURTHS – U/14: Best & Fairest: Garry O'Connell Medal / Leading Goalkicker | | | | | |
| Year | Winner | Club | Votes | Goalkicking | Club | Goals |
|---|---|---|---|---|---|---|
| | Garry O'Connell Medal | | | | | |
| 2001 | Ben McLellan | Holbrook | 27 | | | |
| 2002 | Ben McLellan | Holbrook | 36 | | | |
| 2003 | Marty Bahr | Osborne | 28 | | | |
| 2004 | Kade Klemke | Henty | 28 | | | |
| 2005 | Jesse Kent | Culcairn | 38 | | | |
| 2006 | Tom Alexander | Lockhart | 37 | | | |
| 2007 | Beau Walker | Howlong | 46 | | | |
| 2008 | Hayden Dalitz | Bill Crows | 54 | | | |
| 2009 | Josh Jones | Holbrook | 43 | Ryan Cannon | Howlong | 42 |
| 2010 | Damian Wilson | CDHBU | 45 | Jakob Hanrahan | CDHBU | 65 (69) |
| 2011 | Matt Klemke & | Henty | 46 | Scott Taylor | Henty | 47 (48) |
| | Lachie Lane | Osborne | 46 | | | |
| 2012 | Andrew Yates | Henty | 45 | Mathew Walker | CDHBU | 25 |
| 2013 | Jacob Chant | Osborne | 37 | Abe Wooden | Lockhart | 82 (87) |
| 2014 | Will Holmes | Holbrook | 41 | Mathew Walker | CDHBU | 56 (60) |
| 2015 | George Sandral | Bill Crows | 42 | Jonathon Male | Henty | 57 (65) |
| 2016 | Josh Klemke | Henty | 45 | Bailey Minogue | CDHBU | 52 (53) |
| 2017 | Jake Thomas | RWW Saints | 41 | Josh Williams | Henty | 32 (34) |
| 2018 | Nathan Wardius | RWW Saints | 43 | Harry Plunkett | Holbrook | 27 (32) |
| 2019 | Mitchell Way | Culcairn | 49 | John Ryan | Osborne | 59 (70) |
| 2020 | In recess > | COVID-19 | | | | |
| 2021 | Bodhi Kerr | Jindera | 33 | Bill McMillan | Jindera | 28 |
| 2022 | Hamish Livermore | Holbrook | 47 | Cohen Tunks | Henty | 40 (41) |
| 2023 | Levi Phibbs | CDHBU | 27 | Harry Thompson | Howlong | 53 (60) |
| 2024 | Sam Douglas | Osborne | 39 | Sam Douglas | Osborne | 43 (45) |
| 2025 | | | | Ollie Cardile | Holbrook | 54 (59) |
| 2026 | Fletcher Way | Culcairn | 45 | Kobe Hyde | Lockhart | 43 (44) |

- – () Brackets tally includes goals kicked in finals

== VFL / AFL Players ==
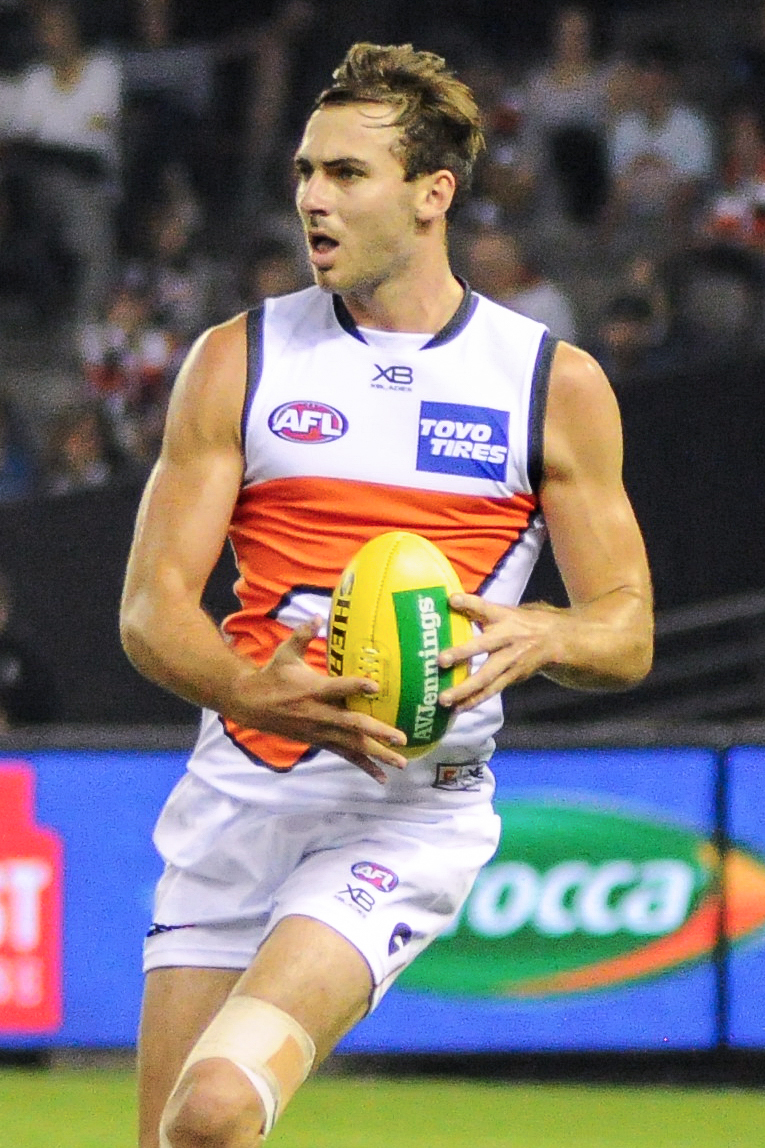
Jeremy Finlayson

The following former Hume FL players have played senior VFL / AFL football and / or been drafted to an AFL team, with the year indicating their VFL / AFL debut.

- 1957 – Vin Bourke – North Melbourne via (Henty)
- 1962 – Neville Forge – South Melbourne via Walla Walla
- 1966 – Greg Lambert – South Melbourne via Corowa FC Juniors
- 1968 – George McInnes – Richmond via Brocklesby
- 1969 – Lindsay Jacob – North Melbourne via Walla Walla
- 1985 – Hilton Kotzur – Sydney Swans via Walbundrie
- 1988 – David Willis – Sydney via (Henty)
- 1991 – Darren Holmes – Sydney Swans via Walla Walla
- 1997 – Josh Wooden – West Coast Eagles via Lockhart
- 2001 – Brent Piltz – Sydney via (Henty)
- 2001 – Justin Koschitzke – St Kilda via Brocklesby
- 2003 – Henry Playfair – Geelong via Holbrook, New South Wales
- 2003 – Adam Schneider – Sydney via (Osborne)
- 2008 – Tony Armstrong – Adelaide via (Brocklesby-Burrumbuttock)
- 2008 – Dean Terlich – Sydney via (Osborne)
- 2012 – Anthony Miles – Richmond via (Howlong)
- 2012 – Sam Rowe – Carlton via (Walla Walla)
- 2012 – Sam Schulz – Greater Western Sydney via (Culcairn)
- 2015 – Jeremy Finlayson – Greater Western Sydney via (Culcairn)
- 2015 – Daniel Howe – Hawthorn via Rennie
- 2016 – Sam Murray – Collingwood via (Henty)
- 2017 – Max Lynch – Collingwood via Jindera
- 2017 – Harrison Macreadie – Carlton via Henty
- 2019 – Alyce Parker – Greater Western Sydney via Holbrook
- 2021 – Nick Murray – Adelaide via (Henty)
- 2022 – Nicholas Madden – Greater Western Sydney via Osborne (Category B rookie)
- 2023 - Nathan Wardius - Greater Western Sydney via Rand-Walbundrie-Walla (Category B rookie)
- 2024 – Shaun Mannagh – Geelong via Walla Walla
- 2024 – Toby Murray – Adelaide via Henty (Mid season draft rookie)
- 2024 – Aidan Johnson – Melbourne via (Brocklesby-Burrumbuttock) (No.68)
- 2024 - Ewan Mackinlay - Port Adelaide via Holbrook (Mid season draft rookie)

== Club Championships ==
Football

| Year | Club | Points |
|---|---|---|
| 1991 | Walbundrie | |
| 1992 | Culcairn | 96 |
| 1993 | Culcairn | 95 |
| 1994 | Henty | 76 |
| 1995 | Culcairn | 94 |
| 1996 | Culcairn | 179.5 |
| 1997 | Walla Walla | 196 |
| 1998 | Osborne | 187 |
| 1999 | Lockhart | 199 |
| 2000 | Holbrook | 176 |
| 2001 | Holbrook | 210 |
| 2002 | Lockhart | 175 |
| 2003 | Walla Walla | 160 |
| 2004 | Holbrook | 204 |
| 2005 | Osborne | 211 |
| 2006 | Osborne | 182 |
| 2007 | Culcairn | 196 |
| 2008 | Jindera | 200 |
| 2009 | RW Tigers | 184 |
| 2010 | Howlong | 194 |
| 2011 | Holbrook | 197 |
| 2012 | Osborne | 188 |
| 2013 | Brock-Burrum | |
| 2014 | Brock-Burrum | |
| 2015 | Osborne | |
| 2016 | Brock-Burrum | |
| 2017 | Brock-Burrum | |
| 2018 | Osborne | |
| 2019 | Brock-Burrum | |
| 2020 | In recess | COVID-19 |
| 2021 | Holbrook | 190 |
| 2022 | Osborne | 206 |
| 2023 | Osborne | 215 |
| 2024 | Osborne | 189 |
| 2025 | Osborne | 352 |
| 2026 | | |

== Hume Netball Association ==
- Established in 1947, as the Hume Basketball Association and was changed to the Hume Netball Association in 1971.

The Hume NA officially merged with the Hume FL to become the Hume Football / Netball League in 2018.

- Highest team score: 104 – Osborne v Culcairn, 2024.

Hume NA – Premiership Table

| | Hume Netball Association: 1947 – to present day | | | | | | | |
| Year | A. Grade 1947 > present | B. Grade 1954 > present | C. Grade 1971 > present | C. Reserve 2006 > present | 16 & Unders 1969 > present | 14 & Unders 1973 > present | 12 & Unders 2014 > present | 11 & Unders 2021 > present |
|---|---|---|---|---|---|---|---|---|
| 1947 | Walla d Walbundrie | | | | | | | |
| 1948 | Walla 26 d Walbundrie 16 | | | | | | | |
| 1949 | Walla Walla | | | | | | | |
| 1950 | Walbundrie d Walla | | | | | | | |
| 1951 | Walbundrie 31 d Walla 30 | | | | | | | |
| 1952 | Burrumbuttock d Walla | | | | | | | |
| 1953 | Walla d Walbundrie | | | | | | | |
| 1954 | Walla 24 d Walbundrie 14 | Walbundrie 26 d Walla 24 | | | | | | |
| 1955 | Walla Walla | Walbundrie/Walla | | | | | | |
| 1956 | Walla Walla | Walla Walla | | | | | | |
| 1957 | Burrumbuttock | Rand | | | | | | |
| 1958 | Balldale | St. Paul's College | | | | | | |
| 1959 | Walbundrie | St. Paul's College | | | | | | |
| 1960 | Walbundrie | Walla Walla | | | | | | |
| 1961 | Balldale | Balldale | | | | | | |
| 1962 | Balldale | Walla Walla | | | | | | |
| 1963 | Walla Walla | St. Paul's College | | | | | | |
| 1964 | St. Paul's College | Walla Walla | | | | | | |
| 1965 | Walla Walla | Walla Walla | | | | | | |
| 1966 | Walla Walla | St. Paul's Red | | | | | | |
| 1967 | Walla Walla | Jindera | | | | | | |
| 1968 | Burrumbuttock | St. Paul's College | | | | | | |
| 1969 | Walla Walla | Brocklesby | | | St. Paul's Red | | | |
| 1970 | Rand | Balldale | | | Walla Walla | | | |
| 1971 | St. Paul's College | Balldale | Walla Walla | | Brocklesby | | | |
| 1972 | Walla Walla | Walbundrie | Walbundrie | | Walla Walla | | | |
| 1973 | Howlong | Howlong | Osborne | | Walla Walla | Walla Walla | | |
| 1974 | Walla Walla | Howlong | Walla Walla | | Walla Walla | Walla Walla | | |
| 1975 | Walla Walla | Walla Walla | Jindera | | Walla Walla | Walla Walla | | |
| 1976 | Rand | Walla Walla | Rand | | St. Paul's College | ? | | |
| 1977 | Rand | St. Paul's College | Rand | | Rand | Rand | | |
| 1978 | Rand | Walla Walla | Brocklesby | | Rand | Walla Walla | | |
| 1979 | East Lavington | Jindera | Walbundrie | | St. Paul's College | Burrumbuttock | | |
| 1980 | Walla Walla | Jindera | Henty | | Henty | Jindera | | |
| 1981 | East Lavington | Walla Walla | Henty | | Henty | Henty | | |
| 1982 | Walla Walla | Lockhart | Henty | | Henty | Henty | | |
| 1983 | East Lavington | Lockhart | Lockhart | | Lockhart | Howlong | | |
| 1984 | Jindera | Lockhart | Walla Walla | | Henty | Henty | | |
| 1985 | Brocklesby | Brocklesby | Lockhart | | Burrumbuttock | Walla Walla | | |
| 1986 | Osborne | Brocklesby | Lockhart | | Henty | Walbundrie | | |
| 1987 | Henty | East Lavington | Jindera | | Walla Walla | Osborne | | |
| 1988 | Brocklesby | East Lavington | Jindera | | Walla Walla | Jindera | | |
| 1989 | Henty | Henty | Walbundrie | | Walla Walla | Jindera | | |
| 1990 | Henty | East Lavington | Walbundrie | | Lockhart | Walla Walla | | |
| 1991 | Brocklesby | Walla Walla | East Lavington | | Henty | Howlong | | |
| 1992 | Brocklesby | East Lavington | Walla Walla | | Walla Walla | Henty | | |
| 1993 | Culcairn | Walla Walla | Culairn | | Henty | Henty | | |
| 1994 | Lockhart | Walla Walla | Howlong | | Jindera | Jindera | | |
| 1995 | Lockhart | Culcairn | Walla Walla | | Jindera | Jindera | | |
| 1996 | Burrumbuttock | Burrumbuttock | Howlong | | Jindera | Henty | | |
| 1997 | Lockhart | Burrumbuttock | Walbundrie | | Lockhart | Henty | | |
| 1998 | Lockhart | Burrumbuttock | Lockhart | | Henty | Culcairn | | |
| 1999 | Henty | Henty | Henty | | Henty | Culcairn | | |
| 2000 | Holbrook | Osborne | Jindera | | Osborne | Culcairn | | |
| 2001 | Osborne | Osborne | Howlong | | Culcairn | Henty | | |
| 2002 | Henty | Henty | Jindera | | Lockhart | Howlong | | |
| 2003 | Lockhart | Howlong | Brocklesby | | Howlong | Holbrook | | |
| 2004 | Lockhart | Howlong | Jinders | | Lockhart | Lockhart | | |
| 2005 | Burrumbuttock | Burrumbuttock | Jindera | | Lockhart | Holbrook | | |
| 2006 | Lockhart | Brock-Burrum | Jindera | Brock-Burrum | Lockhart | Holbrook | | |
| 2007 | Henty | Howlong | Howlong | Murray Magpies | Murray Magpies | Murray Magpies | | |
| 2008 | Jindera | Jindera | Jindera | Rand Walbundrie | Murray Magpies | CDHBU | | |
| 2009 | Murray Magpies | Murray Magpies | Murray Magpies | Murray Magpies | Murray Magpies | Osborne | | |
| 2010 | Jindera | Murray Magpies | Murray Magpies | Murray Magpies | Murray Magpies | CDHBU | | |
| 2011 | Jindera | Murray Magpies | Holbrook | Murray Magpies | Jindera | CDHBU | | |
| 2012 | Murray Magpies | Walla Walla | Murray Magpies | Murray Magpies | CDHBU | Murray Magpies | | |
| 2013 | Jindera | Walla Walla | Holbrook | Osborne | Murray Magpies | Holbrook | | |
| 2014 | Jindera | Brock-Burrum | Murray Magpies | Lockhart | Rand Walbundrie | Holbrook | Billabong Crows | |
| 2015 | Brock-Burrum | Brock-Burrum | Jindera | Lockhart | Murray Magpies | Murray Magpies | Brock-Burrum | |
| 2016 | CDHBU | Henty | Holbrook | Brock-Burrum | Henty | Culcairn | Henty | |
| 2017 | Brock-Burrum | Brock-Burrum | Brock-Burrum | Murray Magpies | Billabong Crows | Brock-Burrum | Osborne | |
| 2018 | Billabong Crows | Howlong | Brock-Burrum | Billabong Crows | RWW Giants | Murray Magpies | Holbrook | |
| 2019 | Billabong Crows | Billabong Crows | Howlong | Lockhart | Osborne | Brock-Burrum | CDHBU | |
| 2020 | 2020: Hume NA cancelled due to the COVID-19 pandemic. 2021: underage netball age categories changed and 11 & Unders competition introduced. | | | | | | | |
| Year | A. Grade | B. Grade | C. Grade | C. Reserve | 17 & Unders | 15 & Unders | 13 & Unders | 11 & Unders |
| 2021 | Season abandoned after 13 matches. No finals series played due to COVID-19. 2021 Minor Premiers listed below. | | | | | | | |
| | 1st: Osborne | 1st: Howlong | 1st: Osborne | 1st: Jindera | 1st: Billabong Crows | 1st: CDHBU | 1st: Brock-Burrum | 1st: Holbrook |
| 2022 | Osborne 52 d Jindera 34 | Osborne 62 d Howlong 29 | Osborne 35 d Howlong 31 | Osborne 39 d Jindera 35 | Billabong Crows 65 d Holbrook 47 | CDHBU 35 d Brock Burrum 27 | Lockhart 26 d Brock Burrum 24 | Osborne 19 d Howlong 10 |
| 2023 | Osborne 48 d Howlong 40 | Jindera 39 d Osborne 31 | Howlong 49* d Osborne 32 | Osborne 49 d Howlong 26 | Henty | Brock-Burrum | Jindera 24 d Holbrook 13 | Osborne |
| 2024 | Jindera 43 d Howlong 41 | Jindera 34 d Holbrook 31 | Howlong 40 d Jindera 31 | Osborne 33 d Jindera 16 | RWW Giants 49 d Holbrook 44 | Lockhart 52 d CDHBU 33 | Jindera 38 d Osborne 18 | Lockhart 27 d Jindera 22 |
| 2025 | Henty 30 d Jindera 29 | Jindera 48 d Howlong 38 | Holbrook 51 d Howlong 50 | Osborne 39 d Jindera 28 | Lockhart 66 d CDHBU 33 | Lockhart 29 d Holbrook 25 | Howlong 52 d B Crows 30 | Brock-Burrum 21 d M Magpies 9 |
| 2026 | Osborne 43 d Jindera 34 | Howlong 54 d Osborne 36 | Howlong 40 d RWW Giants 36 | Osborne 35 d CDHBU 32 | Lockhart 63 d CDHBU 33 | Osborne 30 d Lockhart 25 | Lockhart 31 d M Magpies 30 | Jindera 25 d Lockhart 9 |
| 2027 | | | | | | | | |
| Year | A. Grade | B. Grade | C. Grade | C. Reserve | 17 & Unders | 15 & Unders | 13 & Unders | 11 & Unders |

- In 2021 the underage netball age categories changed as per the above honourboard & the 11 & Unders competition was introduced.
- In 2023 Howlong C. Grade were undefeated premiers.

== Hume Netball Association – Best & Fairest Awards ==
In 2003, the Hume NA best and fairest awards were re-introduced across all grades and an inaugural joint vote count and presentation night was held in conjunction with the Hume Football League.

It appears that the initial best and fairest award in the "Hume Basketball Association" may of commenced in 1948 as the Ada Marks Trophy, but unsure of any award winners between 1949 and 2002. Women's basketball was renamed netball in Australia in 1970.

Hume NA – Netball Best & Fairest Winners List

| HNA | A. Grade | Hume NA | B. Grade | Hume NA | C. Grade | Hume NA | C. Reserve | Hume NA |
|---|---|---|---|---|---|---|---|---|
| Year | Commenced 1947 | Netball Club | Commenced 1954 | Netball Club | Commenced 1971 | Netball Club | Commenced 2006 | Netball Club |
| | Ada Marks Trophy | | | | | | | |
| 1947 | ? | | | | | | | |
| 1948 | Amy Krauz | Balldale | | | | | | |
| 1949 | ? | | | | | | | |
| 2003 | Angela Blampied & | Osborne | Robyn Livermore | Holbrook | Helen Ralston | Walbundrie | | |
| | Allison Seidel | Walla Walla | | | | | | |
| 2004 | Judy Brown | Jindera | Kim Graetz | Burrumbuttock | Angela Ferris | Henty | | |
| 2005 | Michelle Gleeson | Lockhart | Kate Schlig | Brocklesby | Megan Traviss | Brocklesby | | |
| 2006 | Michelle Gleeson | Lockhart | Jessica Sutton | Howlong | Sharna Holland | Jindera | ? | |
| 2007 | Kim Graetz | Burrumbuttock | Teagan Lithgow | Howlong | Aimee Koehler | Howlong | Alix Weidner | Brock Burrum |
| 2008 | Michelle Hewitt | Lockhart | Tania Corrigan | Henty | Bree Barber | Culcairn | Leanne Meyers | Holbrook |
| 2009 | Michelle Hewitt | Lockhart | Rebecca Linehan | Brock Burrum | Jessee Williams | M Magpies | Jess Kotzur | Walla Walla |
| 2010 | Sara Schneider | Osborne | Tracey Furrugia | Jindera | Justine Quilty | Jindera | Rachel Oates & | Jindera |
| | | | | | | | Courtney Teasdale | M Magpies |
| 2011 | Rebekah Churches | Walla Walla | Leah Scholz | Holbrook | Helen Mingoue | Holbrook | Casey Webb | CDHBU |
| 2012 | Tania Corrigan | Henty | Tamika Wholahan | Jindera | Melanie Parker | Holbrook | Michaela Seal | Howlong |
| 2013 | Sophie Hanrahan | CDHBU | April Piltz | Henty | Melanie Parker | Holbrook | Kirsty Anderson | Jindera |
| 2014 | Kirby Hilton & | Jindera | Gabby Bartel | M Magpies | Cassie Lieschke | Walla Walla | Gemma Wall | Culcairn |
| | Sophie Howard | Osborne | | | | | | |
| 2015 | Goergie Luhrs | Henty | Alicia Murphy | Howlong | Kristin Nisbet | Jindera | Megan Kohlhagen | Rand-Walbundrie |
| 2016 | Rebecca O'Connell | Billabong Crows | Denise James | Henty | Leeah Scholz | Holbrook | Naomi Walsh | Howlong |
| 2017 | Sharna Holland | Jindera | Kara Field | Henty | Tahnee Flower | Brock-Burrum | Jessica Tracey | Brock-Burrum |
| 2018 | Jessica Kotzur | RWW Giants | Grace Clancy | Osborne | Brianna Livermore | Brock-Burrum | Olivia Merriman | RWW Giants |
| 2019 | Emma Bridie & | Howlong | Grace Hanrahan | CDHBU | Katelyn Donney | Jindera | Simone Gannon | Henty |
| | Sarah Van Den Heuvel & | Jindera | | | | | | |
| | Jessica Kotzur | RWW Giants | | | | | | |
| 2020 | Hume NA in recess > | COVID-19 | | | | | | |
| 2021 | Harriet Simpson | Billabong Crows | Alannah Cusack | Howlong | Brittany Wright | Howlong | Helene Nimmo | Lockhart |
| 2022 | Sally Hunter | Osborne | Ruby Hyde | Lockhart | Bridget Barnes | Howlong | Louisa Reynolds | Osborne |
| 2023 | Kirby McDonald | Howlong | Isabelle Kreutzburger | RWW Giants | Asta Lumsden | Jindera | Brook Adamson & | M Magpies |
| | | | | | | | Elenanor Readford | Osborne |
| 2024 | Bobbie-Lee Sutherland | Culcairn | Sara Schneider | Osborne | Sarah Matthews & | RWW Giants | Hannah Moore | Howlong |
| | | | | | Sophy Sirr | Jindera | | |
| 2025 | Amy Richardson | Henty | Chelcee Doyle | Billabong Crows | Briana Higgins & | RWW Giants | Rikki Hoskins | Howlong |
| | | | | | Diana Carter | Henty | | |
| 2026 | Tamika Rourke | Brock Burrum Saints | Kara Boyd & | Howlong | Bronwyn McCormack | Howlong | Danielle Byrne | Osborne |
| | | | Olivia McCaig | Brock Burrum Saint | | | | |

Hume NA – Netball Best & Fairest Winners List

| HNA | 16 & Unders | Hume NA | 14 & Unders | Hume NA | 12 & Unders | Hume NA | 11 & Unders | Hume NA |
|---|---|---|---|---|---|---|---|---|
| Year | Commenced 1969 | Netball Club | Commenced 1973 | Netball Club | Commenced 2014 | Netball Club | Commenced 2021 | Netball Club |
| 2003 | Melissa Ballard | Jindera | Rachel Clancy | Walbundrie | | | | |
| 2004 | Allanah Cusack | Lockhart | Rhian Hohnberg | Jindera | | | | |
| 2005 | Erika Hewitt | Culcairn | Brooke Cannon | Howlong | | | | |
| 2006 | Aimee Koehler | Howlong | Stephanie Jones | Holbrook | | | | |
| 2007 | Stephanie Jones | Holbrook | Anna Gates | Brock-Burrum | | | | |
| 2008 | Kimberley Gooden | Lockhart | Stephanie Clancy | Rand-Walbundrie | | | | |
| 2009 | Tori Ellis | Brock-Burrum | Emma Schulz | Culcairn | | | | |
| 2010 | Molly Dowling & | Holbrook | Sophie Hanrahan | CDHBU | | | | |
| | Sophie Howard | Osborne | | | | | | |
| | Georgina O'Brien | Walla Walla | | | | | | |
| 2011 | Mel Guttler & | Osborne | Gabby Biedenweg | Rand-Walbundrie | | | | |
| | Georgia Luhrs | Jindera | | | | | | |
| 2012 | Sophie Hanrahan | CDHBU | Nakita Singe | Henty | | | | |
| 2013 | Nakita Singe | Henty | Alyce Parker | Holbrook | | | | |
| 2014 | Gabby Biedenweg | Rand-Walbundrie | Paige Brown & | Lockhart | Gabrielle Sutcliffe | B Crows | | |
| | | | Jessie Hullick | Walla Walla | | | | |
| 2015 | Brittni Williams | Rand-Walbundrie | Vashti Muller | Henty | Imogen McAlister | Osborne | | |
| 2016 | Anna Kohlhagen | RWW Giants | Imogen Jones | Henty | Madison Lieschke | RWW Giants | | |
| 2017 | Gabrielle Sutcliffe | B Crows | Ebony Hoskin | Howlong | Mia Ennis | RWW Giants | | |
| 2018 | Grace Clancy | Osborne | Mia Lavis | Howlong | Maddie Black | Holbrook | | |
| 2019 | Montanna Kerr | Jindera | Rio Weidemann | Osborne | Kyesha Miller | Lockhart | | |
2020 Hume NA cancelled due to COVID-19 pandemic. In 2021 underage netball age categories changed and 11 & Unders competition introduced.
| Year | 17 & Unders | Netball Club | 15 & Unders | Netball Club | 13 & Unders | Netball Club | 11 & Unders | Netball Club |
| 2021 | Rio Weidemann | Osborne | McKenzie Thomson | Jindera | Layne Griparis | B Crows | Ava Cunningham | B Crows |
| 2022 | Francesca Morton | Osborne | Tamir Richardson | CDHBU | Victoria Trevaskis | Lockhart | Santanna Sadler | Culcairn |
| 2023 | Priya Kohlhagen | RWW Giants | Daija Lavea | Holbrook | Adelaide Phegan | RWW Giants | Eva Smith | Lockhart |
| 2024 | Priya Kohlhagen | RWW Giants | Victoria Trevaskis | Lockhart | Hallee Yensch | Jindera | Emilianna Byrnes | Jindera |
| 2025 | Daija Lavea | Holbrook | Elisabeth Klingner | Billabong Crows | Elizabeth O'Connell | Billabong Crows | Anna Gleeson | Osborne |
| 2026 | Victoria Trevaskis | Lockhart | Molly Driscoll | Osborne | Lexi McCall | RWW Giants | Lily Knight | Brock Burrum Saints |

- In 2021 the underage netball age categories changed as per the above honourboard & the 11 & Unders competition was introduced.

== Hall of Fame ==
The following people have been inducted into the Hume Football League – Hall of Fame.

| Year | Inductee |
|---|---|
| 2015 | Peter Carroll |
| | Des Kennedy |
| | Lindsay Norman |
| | Gary O'Connell |
| | Merv Wegener |
| 2016 | Bill Barton |
| | Col Black |
| | Harry Gardiner |
| | Ian Kreutzberger |
| | Trevor Smith |
| 2017 | David Coulston |
| | Ted Miller |
| | Graham Scholz |
| | Don Star |
| | Bill Thomas |
| 2018 | George Azzi |
| | Kelly Azzi |
| | Jill Kohlhagen |
| | Noreen Norman |
| | Terry O'Halloran |
| | John Trevaskis |
| 2019 | Roy Batson |
| | Gary Drew |
| | Bert Haynes |
| | Ian Schlig |
| | Alwyn Schmidt |
| 2022 | Peter Morris |
| | Julieanne Clancy |
| | Jack Stakelum |
| | Scott McGrath |
| | Gary Mickan |
| 2024 | Claude Tomlinson |
| | Wendy Wooden |
| | Ken Lindner |
| | Ivan Beanie |
| | Rob O'Connell |
| 2026 | Des Feuerherdt |
| | Michelle Hewitt |
| | Steve Koschitzke |
| | Dallas Kotzur |
| | David Schilg |

== Life Members ==
The following people are Hume FL Life Members, rewarded for outstanding service.

Hume Football League

| Year | Life Member |
|---|---|
| 1959 | George Azzi |
| 1959 | Kelly Azzi |
| 1966 | Jack Wood |
| 1966 | Roy McDonald |
| 1966 | Bert Webb |
| 1974 | Ern Wehner |
| 1975 | Des Kennedy |
| 1976 | Alex Beer |
| 1986 | Merv Wegener |
| 1986 | Bill Thomas |
| 1999 | Gary O'Connell |
| 2007 | Barry Malone |

Hume Netball Association

| Year | Life Member | Club |
|---|---|---|
| 1966 | Dot Odewahn | Walla Walla |
| 1966 | Jack Odewahn | Walla Walla |
| 1966 | Joan Lucas | Balldale |
| 1977 | Jean Trethowan | Rand |
| 1977 | Mary Fielder | Jindera |
| 1977 | Gladys Klose | Walla Walla |
| 1977 | Thelma Moll | Jindera |
| 1986 | Alan Klose | Walla Walla |
| 1993 | Allison Scott | Henty |
| 1996 | Shelia Klein | Jindera |
| 2001 | Heather Habermann | Walbundrie |
| 2001 | Jill Kohlhagen | Walla Walla |
| 2006 | Julianne Clancy | Walbundrie |
| 2012 | Janice Beesley | Brock-Burrum |
| 2012 | Elaine Carter | Walla Walla |
| 2015 | Carla Fletcher | Lockhart |
| 2016 | Liza Gooden | Lockhart |
| 2020 | Emily Bush | Billabong |
| 2020 | Tracy Bush | CDHBU |
| 2020 | Sharon Riley | Jindera |
| 2023 | Kylie Kelleher | RWW Saints |
| 2023 | Tracy Lieschke | Henty |

Associate Life Members

(Coreen & DFL)

| Year | Life Member |
|---|---|
| | Lindsay Norman |
| | Noreen Norman |
| | Peter Carroll |
| | Claude Tomlinson |

== Office Bearers ==
Hume Football League

| Year | President | Secretary | Treasurer |
|---|---|---|---|
| 1933 | T Goldsworthy Jnr | G Kotthoff | G Kotthoff |
| 1934 | Thomson | G Kotthoff | G Kotthoff |
| | O Klose | | |
| 1935 | O Klose | G Kotthoff | G Kotthoff |
| 1936 | E Davies | G Kotthoff | G Kotthoff |
| 1937 | C Paganstecher | R Moore | R Moore |
| 1938 | George Nation | R Moore | R Moore |
| 1939 | George Nation | E King | E King |
| 1940 | George Nation | E King | E King |
| 1941–44 | In recess due to | World War II | |
| 1945 | George Azzi | Allan Falkiner | |
| 1946 | George Azzi | S F Lawson | S F Lawson |
| 1947 | George Azzi | S F Lawson | S F Lawson |
| 1948 | George Azzi | K J Flannery | K J Flannery |
| 1949 | George Azzi | K J Flannery | |
| 1950 | George Azzi | K J Flannery | |
| 1951 | George Azzi | K J Flannery | |
| 1952 | George Azzi | R B Ponsford | R B Ponsford |
| 1953–56 | George Azzi | T J Margrie | T H Margrie |
| 1957 | George Azzi | Bill Ryan | Bill Ryan |
| 1958 | George Azzi | John Biggers | John Biggers |
| 1959 | George Azzi | Ian McInemy | Ian McInemy |
| 1960–61 | H.T. "Bert" Webb | Ian McInemy | Ian McInemy |
| 1962–75 | H.T. "Bert" Webb | Des Kennedy | Des Kennedy |
| 1976–82 | Max Johnson | Des Kennedy | Des Kennedy |
| 1983–87 | Gary O'Connell | Des Kennedy | Des Kennedy |
| 1988–90 | Gary O'Connell | Des Kennedy | Colin Donnolley |
| 1991–92 | Gary O'Connell | Des Kennedy | Tony Wood |
| 1992–97 | Gary O'Connell | Tony Wood | Michael Broughan |
| 1998–00 | Gary O'Connell | Barry Malone | Michael Broughan |
| 2001 | Gary O'Connell | Barry Malone | Dallas Kotzur |
| 2002 | Merv Wegener | Barry Malone | Dallas Kotzur |
| 2003–05 | Merv Wegener | Barry Malone | Karl Lezius |
| 2006–11 | Merv Wegener | Barry Malone | Barry Malone |
| 2012–13 | Merv Wegener | Barry Malone | Christine Biar |
| 2014 | Merv Wegener | Barry Malone & | Christine Biar |
| | | Dalton Wegener | |
| 2015–16 | Merv Wegener | Dalton Wegener | Christine Biar |
| | | General Manager | |
| 2017 | Merv Wegener | Dalton Wegener | Christine Biar |
| 2018–21 | Brendan I'Anson | Dalton Wegener | Not Applicable |
| 2022–24 | Phillip Bouffler | Dalton Wegener | N/A |

Hume Netball Association

| Year | President | Secretary | Treasurer |
|---|---|---|---|
| 1947 | | | |
| 1948 | M Schliebs | J McCrum | J McCrum |
| 1949 | | | |
| 1950 | | | |
| 1951 | | | |
| 1952 | | | |
| 1953–55 | Joan Lucas | Pat Smith | Pat Smith |
| 1956 | Joan Lucas | Norma Schulz | Norma Schulz |
| 1957–58 | Judith Heery | Joy Cooper | Joy Cooper |
| 1959 | M Richardson | M Longmire | M Longmire |
| 1960 | J McLellan | D Groach | D Groach |
| 1961–62 | Joan Lucas | Robyn Perry | Robyn Perry |
| 1963 | Rebecca Severin | Joan Lucas | Joan Lucas |
| 1964 | Dorothy Schlig | Joan Lucas | Joan Lucas |
| 1965 | Loraine McLellan | Cheryl Bocquet | Cheryl Bocquet |
| 1966 | Thelma Moll | Helen Anderson | Helen Anderson |
| 1967 | Thelma Moll | Iris Leske | Iris Leske |
| 1968–69 | Thelma Moll | Con Chen | Con Chen |
| 1970 | Thelma Moll | J Scott | J Scott |
| 1971–72 | Thelma Moll | Con Chen | Con chen |
| 1973–75 | Thelma Moll | Gladys Klose | Jenny Cunningham |
| 1976 | Thelma Moll | Gladys Klose | Jean Hall |
| 1977 | | | |
| 1978 | | | |
| 1979 | | | |
| 1980 | | | |
| 2005 | Marion Vile | | |
| 2011–17 | Julianne Clancy | Liza Gooden | Elaine Carter |
2018: Hume NA merged with Hume FL to form the Hume FNL

== See also ==
- AFL NSW/ACT
- Australian rules football in New South Wales
- Coreen & District Football League
- Farrer Football League
- Group 9 Rugby League
- Group 13 Rugby League
- Ovens & Murray Football League
- Picola & District Football League
- Riverina Football Association
- Tallangatta & District Football League

== Sources ==
- Wegener, Leon (editor) Walla Walla Football Club 1903–1978 (1978)
- Wegener, Leon (editor) Hume: A History of the Hume Football League. 1933 to 2018.
