= Brent Piltz =

Australian rules footballer

Personal information
- Full name: Brent Piltz
- Born: 13 November 1978 (age 47)
- Original teams: Henty, North Albury (O&MFL)
- Draft: No. 60, 2001 Rookie Draft

Playing career^{1}
Years	Club	Games (Goals)
2001	Sydney	1 (0)
- ^{1} Playing statistics correct to the end of 2012.

Brent Piltz (born 13 November 1978) is a former Australian rules footballer who played with Sydney in the Australian Football League (AFL) in 2001.

Initially from Henty Football Club where he won the 1996 Hume Football League Thirds best and fairest award and was drafted by Sydney from North Albury in the Ovens & Murray Football League in the 2001 rookie draft as a 22-year-old, Piltz played a single senior game and recorded only one career disposal.

A defender, Piltz is best known for his playing and coaching career in the O&M with North Albury and Myrtleford, and in the Hume Football League with his junior club Henty. Piltz was part of two senior premierships with Henty: one as a 17-year-old in 1996, and the other as a 35-year-old co-coach in 2014.
