= Craig Smith (Australian rules footballer) =

Australian rules footballer

Personal information
- Born: 27 January 1967 (age 59)
- Original team: Lalbert
- Height: 186 cm (6 ft 1 in)
- Weight: 83 kg (183 lb)

Playing career^{1}
Years	Club	Games (Goals)
1986–1993	Richmond	72 (23)
- ^{1} Playing statistics correct to the end of 1993.

Craig Smith (born 27 January 1967) is a former Australian rules footballer who played with Richmond in the Victorian/Australian Football League (VFL/AFL).

A defender from Lalbert, Smith finished second in the 1986 Richmond best and fairest, which was his debut season. He played 20 games that year, the most he would ever play in a VFL/AFL season, with his career being restricted by injury. Smith, who started as a half-back flanker but was also used as a centreman and on the wing, played 10 games in 1987, then did not feature at all in 1988 and made just four appearances in 1989. He played with Richmond for four more years, including a 16-game season in 1991.

Smith was the captain-coach of Hume Football League club Osborne for their 2000 and 2001 premiership teams. His performance in the 2000 Grand Final earned him the Des Kennedy Memorial Medal.
