= North Albury Football Club =

North Albury

Names
- Full name: North Albury Football Netball Club Inc
- Nickname: The Hoppers

2026 season
- Home-and-away season: 7th
- Leading goalkicker: Tim Broomhead (26)
- Best and fairest: Julian Hayes

Club details
- Founded: 1937; 89 years ago
- Colours
- Competition: Ovens & Murray Football League
- President: Clint Eckhardt
- Coach: Tim Broomhead
- Premierships: (7): 1946, 1948, 1955, 1980, 1984, 1999, 2002
- Ground: Bunton Park, North Albury

Uniforms
Home

Other information
- Official website: hoppersfc.com.au

The North Albury Football Netball Club, nicknamed the Hoppers, is an Australian rules football and netball club playing in the Ovens & Murray Football League (O&MFL). They are incorporated as part of the North Albury Sports Club licensed club at Bunton Park in North Albury, Albury, where they play their home matches. The club has won six O&MFL premierships. The Hoppers currently play in forest green guernseys with a gold vee and the "Hopper" logo on the right side. Previous guernsey designs included a dark green and gold design similar to the West Coast Eagles' classic wingtip design (up to 2008) and a gold design with two dark green vees over the yoke. The club song is a version of "Join in the Chorus" with some words altered from the AFL Kangaroos version.

== History ==
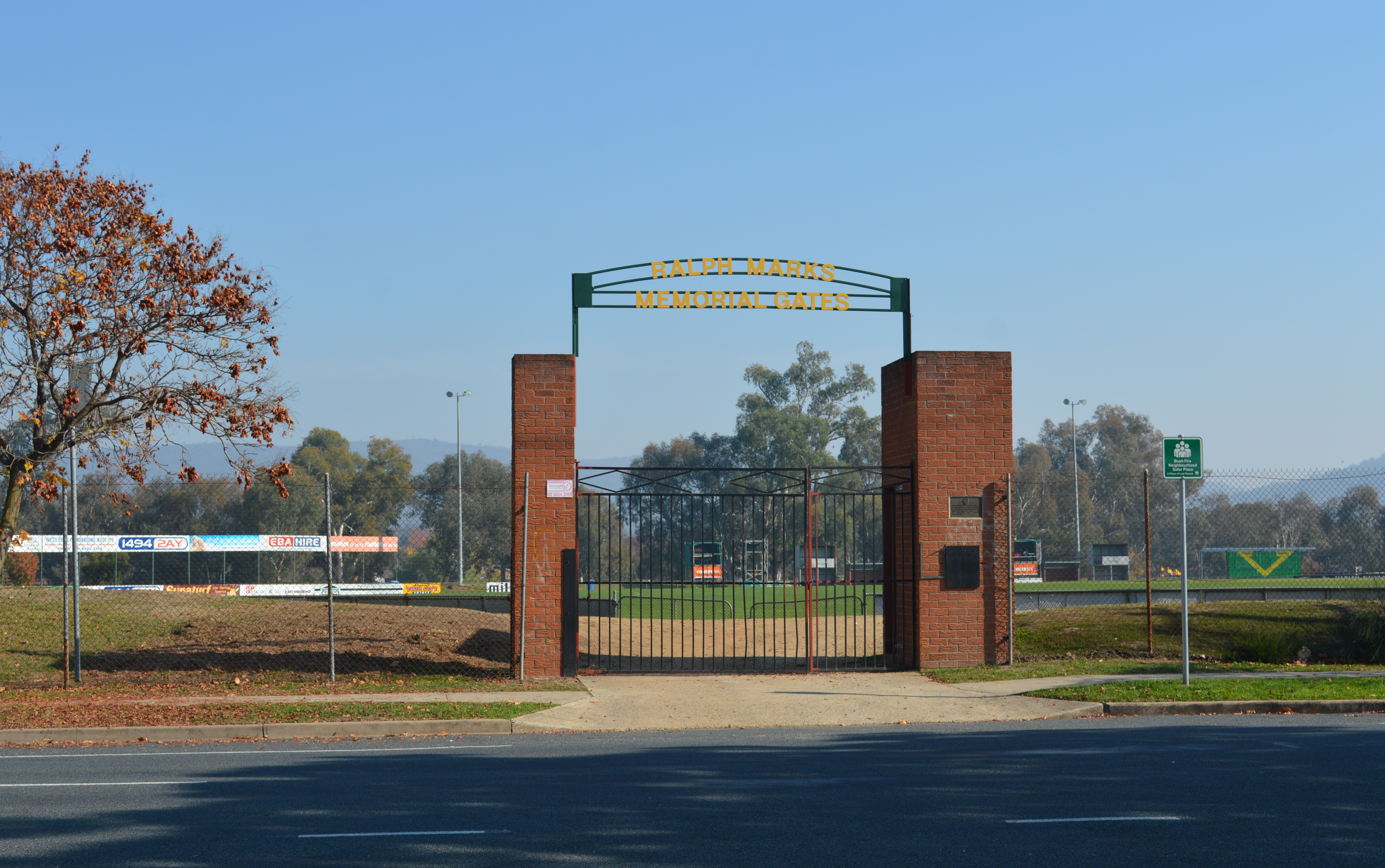
Ralph Marks Gates, Bunton Park

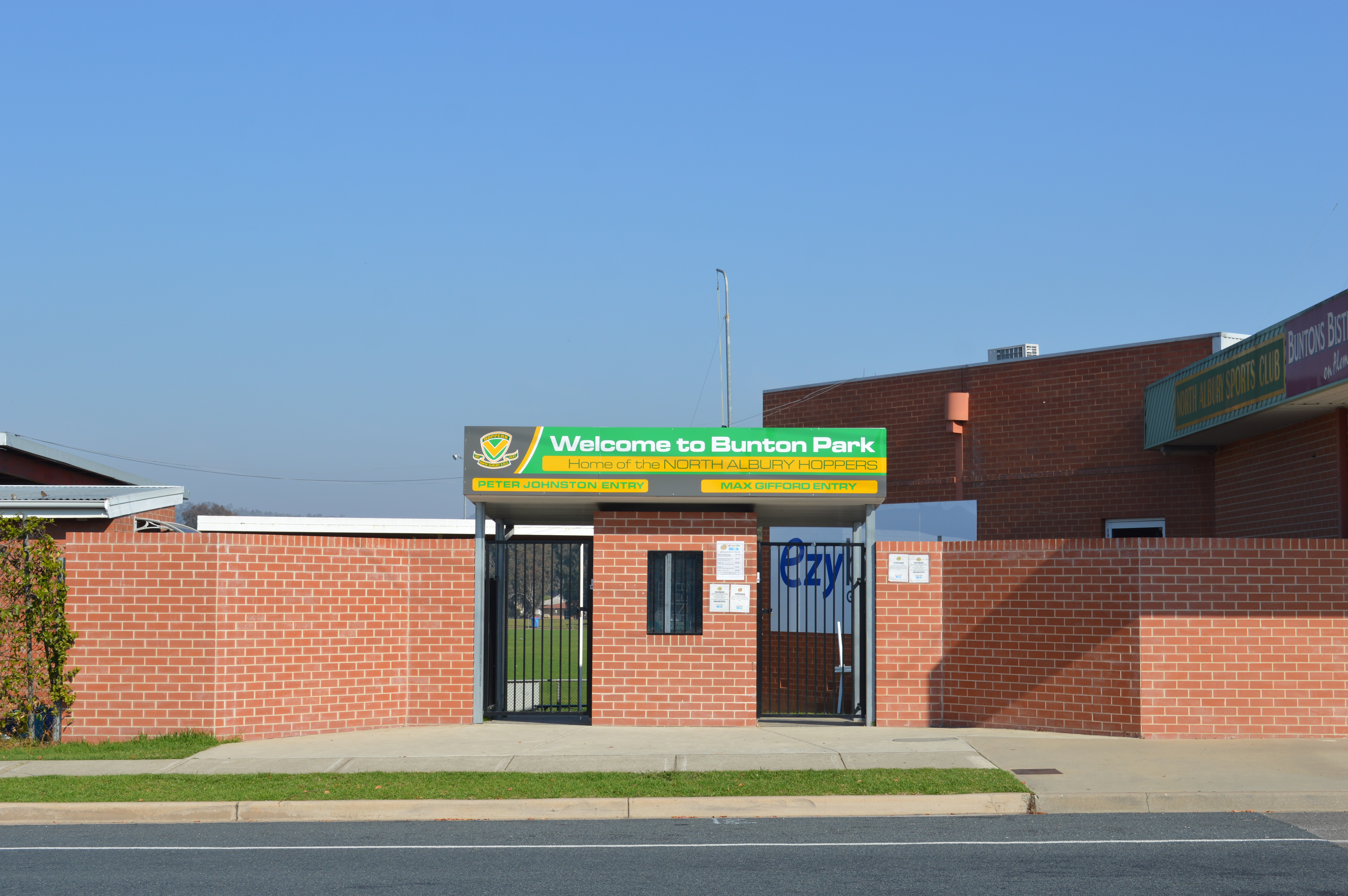
Bunton Park Entrance, North Albury

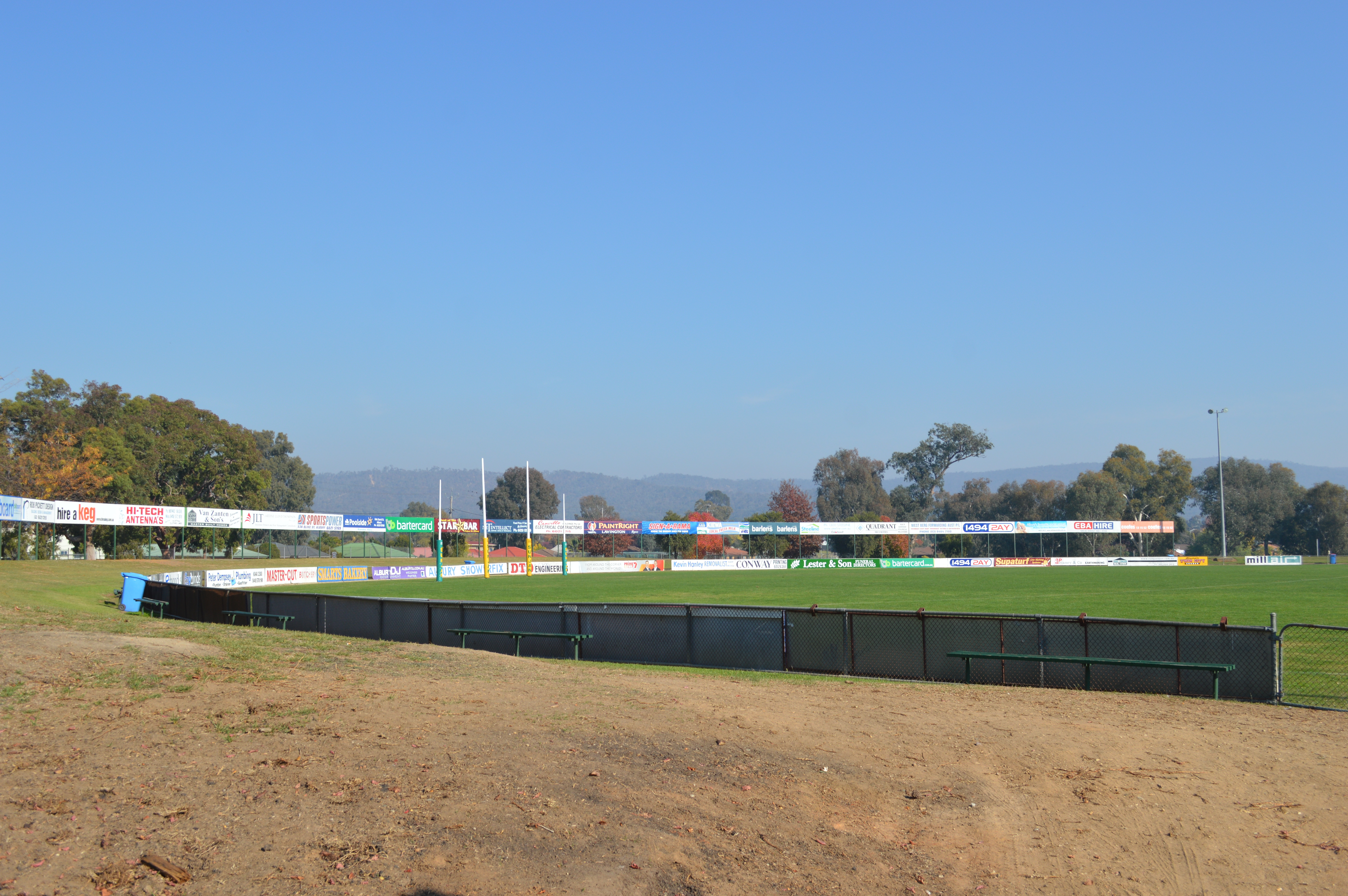
Bunton Park Oval, North_Albury

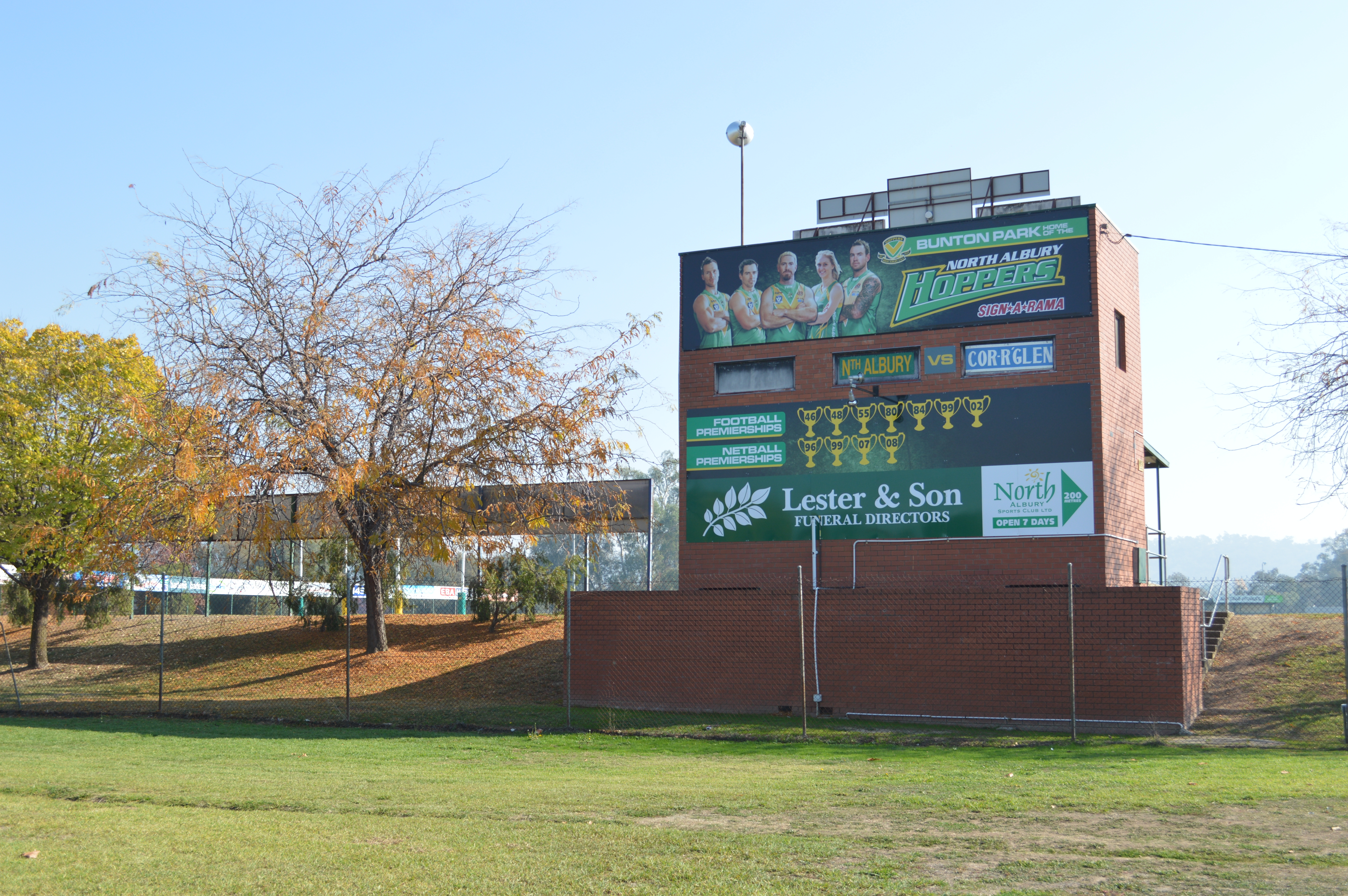
Bunton Park Scoreboard, North_Albury

The club was formed in 1937 as the North Albury Junior Football Club and played in the newly formed Albury and Border Junior Football League as an Under 21 side between 1937 and 1941 before a recess in local football between 1942 and 1944 due to World War Two.

In 1945, the North Albury senior team was first established and competed in the Albury & Border Football Association and lost their semi-final match to South Albury.

Hawthorn played a combined Albury & Border Football Association representative team on the Albury Sports Ground in September 1945, with Hawthorn winning in a high scoring match with a number of North Albury players participating.

Then in 1946, the club entered a senior team in the Chiltern & District Football Association (North Albury Premiers) and a Under 21 team in the Albury and Border Junior Football League.

In 1947, North Albury seniors moved into the Ovens & Murray Football League competition. Premiers in 1948, North Albury also defeated 1948 Wimmera Football League premiers, Stawell in late September 1948 at the Albury Sports Ground.

In 1951 and 1952 North Albury Reserves team played in the Hume Football League senior competition, prior to joining the O&MFL Reserves competition in 1953.

In 1953, the club trained at the Hovell Tree Reserve, which was flood lit and had use of the changerooms.

Bunton Park was established during the post-World War II period in an area that was quickly becoming established with housing and North Albury FC moved in as a tenant in 1960, after sharing the Albury Sports Ground with Albury FC between 1937 and 1959. Bunton Park is named after Cleaver Bunton, long-time mayor of Albury, rather than his famous footballing brother Haydn Bunton, although neither played for North Albury.

In the early 1980s the club was beset by financial difficulties causing it to fall in arrears in paying match payments to its players. In the meantime the club committee was endeavouring to establish a licensed club at its ground, which would allow it to serve alcohol outside of match times and house poker machines. With the establishment of the licensed club in 1984, the club's future in the O&MFL was secured.

A large number of North Albury players have gone on to play in the VFL/AFL, such as 1984 Morris Medallist Rudy Yonson, who played a number of games with the Sydney Swans, and most famously Brett Kirk, who played with North Albury up to the 1998 season and then joined the rookie list of the Sydney Swans on trial the following year, later being elevated to the main list and being an integral part of the Swans' 2005 premiership-winning side.

As many as 20 odd players have been recruited from North Albury to the VFL/AFL including Peter Curtis (North), Ross Henshaw (North), Don Ross (Footscray) and Brian Leahy (Melbourne) amongst others. Anthony Miles, the 2014 star recruit for Richmond from GWS, also played his junior football at North Albury and Howlong.

Other ex-VFL/AFL players to have coached the club to an O&MFL premiership include Keith Shea, Tim Robb and Martin Cross Snr.

The three-time AFL premiership player Jason Akermanis coached the club in 2013 to 2016.

North Albury traditionally play an Anzac Day fixture against cross-town rivals, the Albury Tigers, with the venue alternating between the two clubs every year.

== Football Timeline ==
- 1937 - 1941: Albury & Border Junior Football League
- 1942 - 1944: In recess due to World War Two
- 1945 - Albury Border Football Association
- 1946 - Chiltern & District Football Association
- 1947 - 2019: Ovens & Murray Football League
- 2020 - In recess > COVID-19
- 2021 - 2026: Ovens & Murray Football League

== Football Premierships ==
Seniors

- Chiltern & District Football Association
  - 1946
- O&MFL
  - 1948, 1955, 1980, 1984, 1999, 2002.

Reserves

- O&MFL
  - 1954, 2000

Thirds

- O&MFL
  - Nil

Juniors

- Albury & Border Junior Football League
  - 1940, 1941 1949, 1950, 1954.

Runner up

- Seniors
  - 1950, 1956, 1973, 1975, 1986, 2000, 2004, 2007
- Reserves
  - 1955, 1981, 1985, 1987, 2003
- Thirds
  - 1993
- Juniors
  - 1939

== Football Coaches ==
Seniors

- 1945 - Alec Bishop
- 1946 - Ted Beaumont
- 1947 - Alec Bishop
- 1948 - 1949: Keith Shea
- 1950 - Don Wilks
- 1951 - 1953: Bill King
- 1954 - 1956: Tim Robb
- 1957 - 1958: Kevin Wylie
- 1959 - 1962: Don Ross
- 1963 - 1965: Graeme MacKenzie
- 1966 - Ian Aston
- 1967 - 1968: Ralph Rogerson
- 1969 - 1970: John Sharrock
- 1971 - Tim Robb
- 1972 - Stan Sargeant
- 1973 - 1974: Mike Porter
- 1975 - 1977: Vern Drake
- 1978 - 1979: John Smith
- 1980 - 1981: Col Trevaskis
- 1982 - 1991: Martin Cross
- 1992 - Merv Neagle
- 1993 - 1994:
- 1995 - 1996: Martin Cross
- 1997 - 2001: Ernie Whitehead
- 2002 - 2006: Corey Lambert
- 2007 - 2010: Travis Hodgson
- 2011 - 2012: Bob Craig
- 2013 - 2016: Jason Akermanis
- 2017 - Clint Gilson / Dan Leslie
- 2018 - Clint Gilson / Chris Schmidt
- 2019 - 2020: Isaac Muller
- 2021 - 2022: Luke Norman
- 2022 - Clint Gilson / Corey Lambert
- 2023 - 2026: Tim Broomhead

== North Albury - Hall of Fame Inductees ==
- 2016 - Martin Cross, Ralph Marks, Arthur Pickett, Stan Sargeant, John Smith
- 2017 - Paula Cary, Travis Hodgson, Don Ross, Keith Shea, Kevin Weule
- 2018 - Les Braunack, Roly Hines, Jason Kerr, Corey Lambert, Rogers Peters
- 2019 - Fiona Boyer, Ken Bruce, Ron James, Robert Murray, Brent Piltz
- 2020 - No Inductees due to COVID-19
- 2021 - Clint Eckhardt, Brett Kirk, Brandon Ryan, Peter Westland, Lester Yensch
- 2022 - ?
- 2023 - Bill Barton, Vern Drake, Simon Kenny, Dan Leslie, Rudy Yonson
- 2024 - ?
- 2025 - Bob Baker, Terry Farrell, Mark Hilton, Breda O'Kane, Tim Robb

Ovens & Murray FNL - Hall of Fame Inductees

- 2006 - Stan Sargeant, John Smith
- 2015 - Don Ross
- 2017 - Paula Cary, Stan Sargeant (Legend)
- 2018 - Travis Hodgson
- 2019 - Peter Westland
- 2023 - Dan Leslie, John Smith (legend)
- 2025 - Fiona Boyer
- 2026 - Corey Lambert

== Football Best & Fairest Awards ==
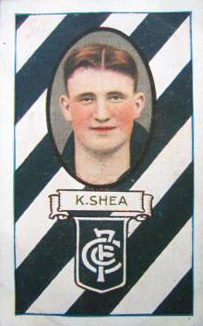
1948 O&MFL premiership captain-coach, Keith Shea

North Albury FNC - Best & Fairest Award Winners
YEAR	SENIORS Commenced 1945	RESERVES Commenced 1951	UNDER 18's Commenced 1973	JUNIORS Commenced 1937
1937				
1938				
1939				
1940				Ted Washington
1941				
1942-44	In recess >	World War 2		
1945				
1946				Eric Allen
1947	Ted Washington			Jack Galvin
1948	Wally Geier			
1949				Bob Morrow
1950	Lester Yensch			
	Keith Shea Memorial Trophy			
1951	Don Ross	Albert Farrah		
		Wally Geier Memorial Trophy		
1952	Lester Yensch	Albert Farrah		
1953	Les Braunack	A Grant		
1954	Ivan Smith	Noel Gould		
1955	Les Braunack			
1956	Ivan Smith			
1957				
1958				
1959				
1960				
1961				
1962				
1963				
1964				
1965				
1966				
1967	John Maddock			
1968	Bob Barker			
1969	John Maddock			
1970				
1971				
1972	John Danckert	Gerald Stakelum		
1973	John Smith			
1974	John Danckert			
1975				
1976	Vern Drake			
1977				
1978				
1979				
1980				
1981	John Smith			
1982	John Smith			
1983				
1984				
1985				
1986	Roger Peters			
1987				
1988	Roger Peters			
1989	Jason Kerr			
1990	Jason Kerr			
1991	Daryl Butler			
1992	Daryl Butler			
1993				
1994				
1995				
1996				
1997				
1998				
1999	Corey Lambert			
2000	Travis Hodgson			
2001	Travis Hodgson	Ben Taylor	Nick McDonald	
2002	Travis Hodgson	Lucas Mellier	Adam Prior	
2003				
2004	Ash Eames	Joel Mackie	Luke Rhodes	
2005				
2006	Brad Horn			
2007	Brandon Ryan			
2008	Brandon Ryan	James Paton	Chris Taylor	
2009	Matt McDonald &	Chris Taylor	Charlie Graeber	
	Brad Horn			
2010	Brandon Ryan	Charlie Graeber	Rory Feltwell	
2011	Brandon Ryan	Sam Hodges	Brodie Smith	
2012	Matt McDonald	Campbell Wylie	Brodie Smith	
2013	Dan Leslie	Adam Elias	Charlton Hindle	
2014	Jarrah Maksymow	Jack Muldoon	Joel Escott	
2015	Dan Leslie			
2016	Dom Brew	Clint Gilson		
2017	Dan Leslie	Clint Gilson		
2018	David Miles			
2019	George Godde			
2020	O&M in recess >	COVID-19		
2021	Jackson Weidemann	Connor Clarke	Luke Boothy	
2022	George Godde	Clint Gilson	Jackson Carey	
2023	Josh Minogue	Connor Bradbury		
2024	Tim Broomhead			
2025	Julian Hayes		Zach Graham	
2026				
YEAR	SENIORS Commenced 1945	RESERVES Commenced 1951	UNDER 18's Commenced 1973	JUNIORS Commenced 1937
Bold Red indicates a senior premiership. Bold green indicates a reserves premiership.

== Leading Football Goalkicking ==
This list of senior football goal kickers below was compiled by O&MFNL Historian, Neil Barter.

North Albury FNC - Leading Goal Kickers
YEAR	SENIORS Commenced 1945	GOALS	RESERVES Commenced 1951	GOALS	UNDER 18's Commenced 1973	GOALS
1945						
1946	Ted Beaumont	36 (48)				
1947	Ted Washington	47				
1948	Jack Wood	37 (43)				
1949	Norm Benstead	58				
1950	Norm Benstead	48 (57)				
1951	Norm Benstead	51				
1952	W "Bill" Orme	38				
1953						
1954	Tim Robb	51				
1955	Norm Benstead	57				
1956	Lester Yensch*	71				
1957	John Star	23				
1958	Stan Sargeant	33				
1959	Stan Sargeant	51				
1960	Stan Sargeant	45				
1961	Stan Sargeant	58				
1962	K Bruce &	28				
	James	28				
1963	Stan Sargeant*	54				
1964	Stan Sargeant	78				
1965	Stan Sargeant*	65				
1966	Stan Sargeant*	76				
1967	Stan Sargeant	75				
1968	Stan Sargeant*	72				
1969	Stan Sargeant	61				
1970	Elliott	35				
1971	Stan Sargeant*	87				
1972	Stan Sargeant	65				
1973	Stan Sargeant	62				
1974	Stan Sargeant*	104				
1975	Vern Drake	111				
1976	Vern Drake*	79				
1977	Vern Drake	37				
1978	Vern Drake	58				
1979	Vern Drake	72				
1980	Brian Parks	109				
1981	Brian Parks	59				
1982	Peter Westlands	75				
1983	Peter Westlands	86				
1984	Peter Westlands	91				
1985	Bert Hollards	39				
1986	Peter Westlands	46				
1987	Paul Ross	38				
1988	Steve Paton	26				
1989	Graeme Cook	52	Peter Westlands*	58		
1990	S Stamp	34				
1991	S Stamp	30				
1992	David Gould	37				
1993	Adam Butler	15				
	C Conboy	15				
	Mark Eyers	15				
1994	Matt Chilcott	78	Jason Vildovas	67	Gary Elliott*	62
1995	Matt Chilcott	75	Garry Elliott	39		
1996	Gerard Butts	24				
1997	R Smith	61				
1998	S Barker	23				
1999	Matt Warry*	54				
2000	Brett Jukawicz	50				
2001	Brendan Hehir*	82	M Sefton Rowston	25		
2002	Brett Piltz	50	M Sefton Rowston	39		
2003	C Parsons	29				
2004	D Murray	52				
2005	B Argus	18				
2006	Adam Pierri	37				
2007	Adam Prior*	67				
2008	Luke Sims	38				
2009	Dan Leslie	67	Liam Scammell	31	Jesse Johnson	25
2010	Dan Leslie	55	Luke Antone	25		
2011	Dan Leslie	29	Josh Land	38	Aaron Bauerle	21
2012	Dan Leslie	40	Josh Land	40		
2013	Adam Prior*	71 (74)	Phil Prior	14	Charlton Hindle	16
2014	Jarrah Maksymow	59	Zac Gallaway &	14		
			Kris Milosta	14		
2015	Kristian Cary	34	Alec Sullivan	19	Alex Paech	28
2016	Ricky Whitehead	41	Mark Wilde	36		
2017	Shaun Mannagh	19	Clint Gilson	10	Jack Penny	12
			Connor Smith	10		
			Liam Williams	10		
2018	Josh Lloyd	27	Danny Warren	27		
2019	Josh Lloyd	23	Daniel Jackson	16	Sam Azzi	30
2020	O&M in recess >		COVID-19			
2021	Flynn Gardner	15	Mitchell Eyers	8	Coby Fitzsimmons &	5
					Declan Thiele	5
2022	Carter Norman	27	Jackson Carey &	5		
			Kirk Wilson	5		
2023	Josh Minogue	33	Jamieson Bouffler	10	Jackson Carey	30
2024	Josh Minogue*	61 (72)	Alex Kohne	20		
2025	Josh Murphy	59 (64)	Kade Brown	23	Tynan Wiesner Milham	26
2026						
YEAR	SENIORS Commenced 1945	GOALS	RESERVES Commenced 1951	GOALS	UNDER 18's Commenced 1973	GOALS
Bold Red indicates a senior premiership. Bold green indicates a reserves premiership.
* - Also won the O&MFL Goalkicking award. *() Figure in brackets includes goals kicked in finals

== O&MFNL Best & Fairest Winners ==
Seniors - Morris Medal

- 1964 - David Sykes
- 1973 - John Smith
- 1984 - Rudy Yonson
- 1999 - Corey Lambert
  - 1974 - John Smith (most votes, but ineligible)

Reserves

- 1972 - Gerry Stakelum
- 1985 - Bill Mulraney
- 1991 - Mick Thorneycroft
- 1994 - Bill Mulraney
- 1999 - Ben Kerr
- 2000 - Shane Wardrop
- 2013 - Ashleigh Sibraa
- 2016 & 2017 - Clint Gilson

Thirds / Under 18's

- 1977 - Anthony McIntosh
- 1980 - Anthony McTavish
- 1993 - Phil Jones
- 1994 - Dean Taylor
- 2004 - James Weavers
- 2005 - Todd Birch

== VFL / AFL Players ==
The following footballers played with North Albury FNC prior to playing VFL / AFL senior football and / or were drafted. The year indicates their VFL / AFL debut.

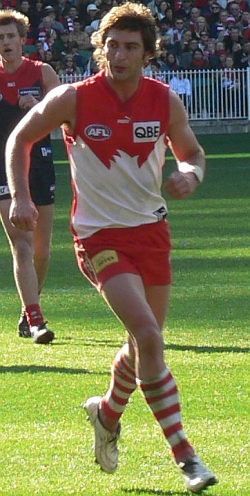
Brett Kirk

- 1952 - Don Ross - Footscray
- 1955 - Bill Barton - North Melbourne
- 1955 - Peter Curtis - North Melbourne
- 1957 - Vin Bourke - North Melbourne
- 1960 - Brian Leahy - Melbourne
- 1961 - John Leahy - Melbourne
- 1963 - Geoff Doubleday - Fitzroy
- 1966 - Terry Leahy - Melbourne
- 1971 - Ross Henshaw - North Melbourne
- 1976 - Alby Smedts - Footscray
- 1980 - Paul Ross - Footscray
- 1980 - Graham Schodde - St. Kilda
- 1985 - Rudy Yonson - Sydney Swans
- 1987 - Brett Yorgey - Collingwood
- 1988 - Gerard Butts - Carlton
- 1999 - Ben Hollands - Richmond
- 1999 - Brett Kirk - Sydney Swans
- 2001 - Brent Piltz - Sydney Swans
- 2001 - Mark Hilton - North Melbourne
- 2015 - Anthony Miles - Richmond
- 2018 - Ben Paton - St Kilda
- 2019 - Doulton Langlands - St Kilda
- 2023 - Tylar Young - Richmond
- 2024 - Shaun Mannagh - Geelong

The following footballers played senior VFL / AFL football prior to playing and / or coaching with North Albury with the year indicating their first season at NAFNC.

- 1948 - Keith Shea - Carlton
- 1950 - Don Wilks - Hawthorn
- 1951 - Bill King
- 1954 - Tim Robb - Footscray
- 1957 - Kevin Wylie - Collingwood
- 1963 - Graeme MacKenzie - Fitzroy
- 1964 - David Sykes - Fitzroy
- 1966 - Ian Aston - Fitzroy
- 1967 - Ralph Rogerson - Fitzroy
- 1969 - John Sharrock - Geelong
- 1971 - Ian Rowland - St Kilda
- 1971 - Frank Hodgkin - St Kilda
- 1973 - Mike Porter - Hawthorn
- 1975 - Vern Drake - Fitzroy
- 1982 - Martin Cross - Carlton
- 2010 - Damian Cupido - Essendon
- 2013 - Jason Akermanis - Brisbane Lions
- 2018 - Clem Smith - Carlton
- 2021 - Luke Norman - Melbourne
- 2022 - Tim Broomhead - Collingwood

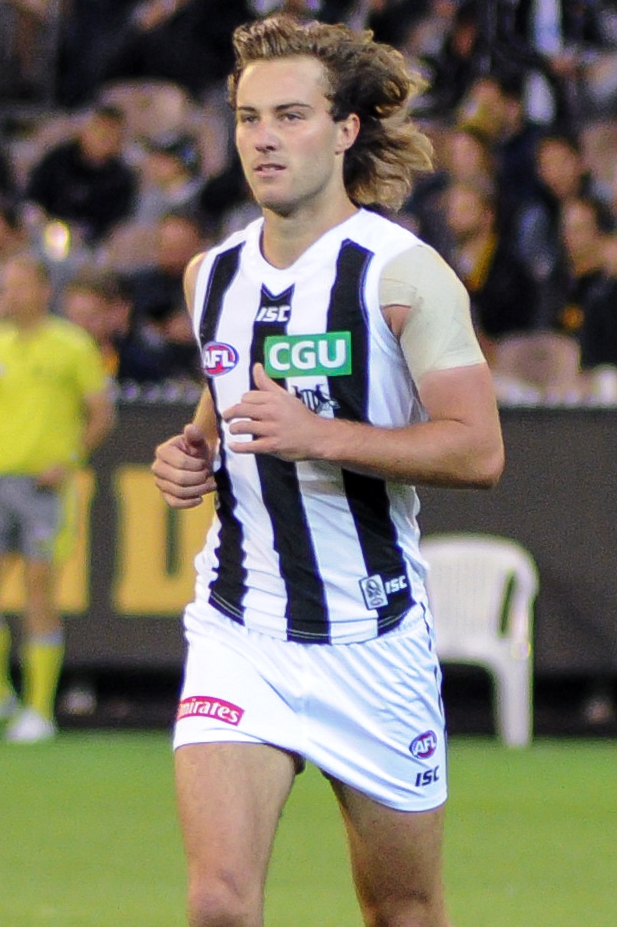
Tim Broomhead, 2017

== Netball ==
The NAFC was established in 1993 and have been very successful both on and off the court, winning a number of premierships across all grades of netball.

O&MFNL - Netball Premierships

- A. Grade
  - 1996, 1999, 2007, 2008
- B. Grade
  - 1994, 1996, 1998, 2006, 2012, 2013, 2014, 2015, 2017
- C. Grade
  - 2001, 2002, 2004, 2005, 2006, 2007, 2008, 2010, 2011, 2016, 2018.
- D. Grade / Under 17's
  - 2012, 2014, 2015, 2018.

== Team song ==
North Albury's theme song is based on a 1920's song - Wee Deoch an Doris, by Scottish singer, Harry Lauder. Their team song is:

Out we come, out we come, out we come to play hey.

Just for recreation's sake to pass the time away, oh Lots of fun, heaps of fun, enjoy yourself today, North Albury boys are hard to beat, when they come out to play.

Sooooo join in the chorus and sing it one and all, Join in the chorus, North Albury's on the ball.

Good old North Albury, they're champions you'll agree, North Albury is the team to play to win for you and me HEY

== See also ==
- Past and present North Albury Football Club players with senior VFL / AFL experience.

== Bibliography ==
- Johnston, David (20 May 2004). "Green and Gold didn't fold in '84" Border Mail
- Halloran, Jessica (10 September 2004). "Never-give-up Kirk arrives". The Age.
