= Peter Curtis =

Peter Curtis may refer to:

- Peter Theo Curtis (born 1968), American journalist held hostage in Syria by al-Nusra Front (2012–2014)
- Peter Curtis (diplomat) (1929–2013), Australian public servant and diplomat
- Norah Lofts (1904–1983), British author, one of whose pen names is Peter Curtis
- Peter Curtis (tennis) (born 1945), former British tennis player
- Sir Peter Curtis, 6th Baronet (1907–1976) of the Curtis baronets
- Peter Curtis (footballer) (born 1933), Australian rules footballer

== See also ==
- Curtis (surname)
