= Paul Roos =

Paul Roos may refer to:

- Paul Roos (Australian rules footballer) (born 1963), Australian rules football player and coach
- Paul Roos (rugby union) (1880–1948), Springbok rugby union captain
- Paul Roos Gymnasium, a high school in Stellenbosch, South Africa

== See also ==
- Paul Ross (born 1956), English presenter, journalist and media personality
- Paul Ross (footballer) (born 1960), Australian rules footballer
