= Mark Hilton =

Mark Hilton may refer to:

- Mark K. Hilton (born 1966), North Carolina politician
- Mark Hilton (Australian footballer) (born 1979), played for North Melbourne
- Mark Hilton (English footballer) (born 1968), English football midfielder
- Mark Hilton (rugby league) (born 1975), English rugby league footballer
- Mark Hilton (tennis) (born 1981), British tennis player

== See also ==
- Mark Hylton (disambiguation)
- Marcus Hilton, dancer
