= Wodonga Raiders Football Club =

Wodonga Raiders

Names
- Full name: Wodonga Raiders Football & Netball Club
- Nickname(s): Raiders, Demons

2024 season
- Home-and-away season: 9th

Club details
- Founded: 1975; 51 years ago
- Colours
- Competition: Ovens & Murray Football League
- Premierships: TDFL (1): 1987; OMFL (1): 1998
- Ground: Birallee Park

Uniforms
Home

Other information
- Official website: Wodonga Raiders FNC

The Wodonga Raiders Football & Netball Club is an Australian rules football and netball club based in the city of Wodonga. The Raiders' football and netball squads currently compete in the Ovens & Murray Football League. The origins of the club dates back to the Kergunyah Football Club.

== History ==
=== Origins ===
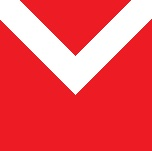
Kergunyah's Jumper: 1923 to 1975

The "Kergunyah Football Club" was established in 1923, based in the small township of Kergunyah, Victoria is choose "Red and White colours" for its playing jumpers. Over the next few decades they spent time in the "Allans Flat District Football Association", the "Yackandandah & District Football League", and the "Dederang and District Football Association".

During this time they competed in two Grand Finals, the 1928 Yackandandah & DFA Grade Grand Final where they were defeated by Yackandandah at Sandy Creek, and the 1937 Dederang & DFA Grand Final where they were defeated by Kiewa (10.5.65 - 11.9.75).

Before the 1940 season Kergunyah went into recess due to a lack of number because of the ongoing War, they continued to be in a state of recess until the 1944 post season. The club was re-activated during the 1945 pre-season, they continued to be based in the small township of Kergunyah, Victoria and chose to "Red and White colours" for its playing jumpers. They re-joined the Yackandandah & District Football League (formally known by "Yackandandah & District Football Association") for the 1945 season.

Kergunyah competed in the Yackandandah & District Football League until 1951. The club went into recess in 1952, prior to joining the neighbouring Tallangatta & District Football League in 1953.

The in 1954 the Yackandandah & District Football League folded due to lack of clubs.

Kergunyah was an early powerhouse in the Tallangatta & District Football League, becoming the first club to achieve a three-peat of premierships (1955–1956–1957), a record only equaled by Mitta United (1959–1960–1961). However, by the early 1970s the club was in trouble, starved for on field success combined with not having very good facilities and with most players & club people residing in the Wodonga area. The tough decision was made following the 1975 season to disband the Kergunyah Football Club.

Kergunyah's three-peat record for most consecutive senior TDFL flags stood for 50-years before being beaten by Mitta United when they achieved the impressive feat of winning four consecutive senior TDFL flags (2004-2005-2006-2007).

Competition	Level	Wins	Year won
Yackandandah & DFA	Seniors Runner-Up	1	1928
Dederang & DFA	Seniors Runner-Up	1	1937
Tallangatta & DFL	Seniors Premierships	3	1955, 1956, 1957

=== Formation ===
Following the 1975 decision to disband the Kergunyah Football Club, a group of former important club people gathered at the Wodonga's Blazing Stump Hotel and decided to create the new club, they would be based at Wodonga's Martin Park and continue to wear Kergunyah's Red and White colours for its playing jumpers. In early 1976 the "Wodonga Demons Football and Sports Club" was established, they joined the Tallangatta And District Football League for the 1976 season, filling the void left by Kergunyah Football Club.

In 1978 the club moved to Martin Park's number two oval (Now known as the Les Cheesley Oval), while here the ground was expanded to full size. After a request to Wodonga Council in 1980, some vacant land was located for a new home ground, and the facility at Birallee Park was completed by the end of the 1983 season.

On field the club was strong in its early years, contesting many final series. During the 80's the club contested three senior Tallangatta & District Football League Grand Finals, the 1980 TDFL Grand Final where they were defeated by Tallangatta Valley (20.10.130 - 13.11.89), the 1985 TDFL Grand Final where they were defeated by 1985 Holbrook (22.17.149 - 13.6.84), and the 1987 TDFL Grand Final where they defeated Mitta United (15.13.103 - 14.13.97).

The club left the Tallangatta & District Football League after the 1988 season, and spent the following post-season preparing to join the Ovens and Murray Football League for the 1989 Season.

=== Changing leagues ===
Following the 1988 decision to allow the Wodonga Demons permission to join the Ovens and Murray Football League, the Wodonga Demons Football and Sports Club went about re-establishing their new identity. They had to change both their name and colours so as to not cause confusion with the Benalla Demons (also wore Red and White colours for its playing jumpers) and the long established Wodonga Football Club (previously the sole Wodonga-based club between 1952 and 1975). The club settled upon the name of the Wodonga Raiders, officially the Wodonga Raiders Sports Club, and chose to wear Red and Navy colours for its playing jumpers.

On field success was very hard to come by during the first three seasons, which resulted in the club being "Awarded" the wooden spoon in 1989 and again 1990. By 1993 the club had improved enough that they almost made the final five. The 1995 season marked the first time the Raiders advanced to the preliminary final where they lost to Albury by 23 points. The club was seeming to come of age as they finishing fifth and making finals again in 1996. During the 1996 post season the club pulled off a major coup when they secured Darren Harris as Senior coach from 1997. The club made their first O&M Grand Final in 1997 against Albury, where they lost by 7 points. The following season the club made their second O&M Grand Final in as many years. This time they faced Lavington whom they went on to beat by 64 points, claiming its first Premiership in its tenth year in the competition. To date the club is yet to return to the Grand Final.

==== Recent years ====
In 2012 the Raiders went hard in the off season to try to keep up with the top sides in the Ovens and Murray, they got the services of former VFL stars Patrick Rose, David Stretton, Eddie Prato and Ben Davies these 4 players were massive gets for the Wodonga side with Davies taking out the Best and Fairest and Rose Kicking 101 goals and winning the Doug Strang medal. The Highlight of the year came when the Raiders upset premiership favourite Albury Tigers in round 7 by 5 points with Rose and Prato playing starring roles in the win. Unfortunately for the Raiders all 4 of them left the side at the end of the season along with a number of other players as well as long time Melbourne traveller and Vic Country ruckman Scott Meyer. The club also lost the services of senior coach Corey Lambert at the end of the season and when he left so did the players, not including the Melbourne players a total of 14 local players left the club 9 of those players being regular seniors players and the other in and out of the side during the season.

The Raiders although not having a great season as a club had some great individual performances:

- Patrick Rose: Doug Strang Medal
- Scott Meyer: Victoria Country Representative
- Nathan Lefoe;: O&M Reserves best and fairest
- Ben Murphy: O&M Thirds best and fairest and the Border mail thirds player of the year

In 2013 the club hired Jindra coach Ken Stevenson as the senior coach to help rebuild the young side after the horror off-season that saw a number of players leave the club. The Raiders topped off their young list with Montmorency Magpies players Dean Limbach, Dean Giles, David Attard and Michael Steven. In the early parts of the season the Wodonga Raiders struggled, and Stevenson had no choice but to blood the youth, with 17-year-olds Bradley St John, Liam Hickey and Jack Donaghey all playing senior games in early 2013.

The raiders were always going to have a tough time of it in 2013 with the players they lost in the off-season, but nobody thought it would get quite this bad, with the lowest points in the season coming in round 8 and 9, when the side went down to fellow cellar-dweller Corowa-Rutherglen, and then the following week they were on the end of a 120-plus-point loss to North Albury on their home soil, with Todd Bryant and Ben Murphy really the only ones putting in the effort against North Albury. The day got even worse when Captain and 5-time best and fairest winner Mark Doolan was ruled out for the rest of the season with a torn ACL just days after the thrashing.

Doolan also told the club weeks later that he was leaving at season's end to go to Tallangatta and District League side Chiltern to pursue a coaching role in the next 2 years. Doolan will go down as one of the Raiders best players of all time.

The Raiders made some radical steps to the future, signing Yackandanah star forward Trent Castles and Queanbeyan players Ben Klemke and Steven Jollifee as players for the 2014 and 2015 seasons. After these signings the Raiders somewhat got on a roll, upsetting Wodonga Bulldogs and Wangarrata Magpies before getting hidings from two of the top sides in the league in Albury and Lavington.

The Raiders' best performances of the year were also their last. After losing to Corowa in round 17 and having no chance to get off the bottom of the ladder in round 18, the Raiders had nothing to lose, and they played that way against North Albury, with superstar forward Dean Limbach bagging 8 goals in the 20-point loss. The Raiders looked like they were going to win all day up until the last 5 minutes of the game, with Danny Atwell and Todd Bryant putting in great performances to almost get the side over the line.

Limbach finished second in the league goal kicking in the bottom of the ladder side, with a total of 68 goals. To prove just how good he is, Limbach kicked 17 goals in the final 2 rounds of the year to finish 3 goals behind North Albury spearhead and 2013 Doug Strang Medallist Adam Prior.

== Raiders Club honours ==
=== Ovens And Murray Hall of Fame - Raider Inductees ===
- Stephen Clarke - 2012
- Simon Bome - 2016

=== Senior coaches: 1976-present ===
Wodonga Demons: 1976-1988

- 1976: Keith Flower
- 1977-1978: Garry Knight
- 1979: Peter McGrath
- 1980-1981: Kevin Richardson
- 1982: Bob Craig
- 1983-1984: Mick Cummins
- 1985: Tom Doolan
- 1986: Jim Jewell / Jack Clancy
- 1987-1988: Bert Hollands

Wodonga Raiders: 1989–present

- 1989-1992: Mark Turner
- 1993: Simon Meehan
- 1994-1995: Peter Copley
- 1996: Jim Silvestro
- 1997-1999: Darren Harris
- 2000-2002: Simon Bone
- 2003-2004: Christin Macri
- 2005: Dean Lupson
- 2006: Adrian Whitehead
- 2007-2008: Paul Twycross & Brendan Way
- 2009-2012: Corey Lambert
- 2013-2014: Ken Stevenson
- 2015-2018: Daryn Creswell
- 2019- : Jarrod Hodgkin

=== Life members ===
- John Wink
- Ken Gallagher
- M. Schlink
- L. Anderson
- W. Mooney
- J. Casey
- N. Jarvis
- R. Barrette
- Ross Hedley
- F. Richardson
- B. Collins
- M. Ley
- Helen Wink (dec.)
- Tim Mooney
- F. Goonan
- G. James
- C. Robinson (dec.)
- Nic Conway
- T. Rixon
- J. Owens
- Simon Bone
- Stephen Clarke
- J. Robinson
- M. Brown
- Paul Twycross
- John Howes
- Paul Knight
- Graeme Lester
- R. Fleming (dec.)
- Brendan Way
- Les Lee
- A. Bergin(dec)
- Rod Mayne
- Mick Wernert
- Shane Packer
- J. Hunter
- G. Perrett
- G Porter
- J Lonergan

(dec.) denotes deceased.

=== Raiders all star side ===
Raiders All-Star Side
B:	Anthony McIvor	Paul Knight	Joe Lonergan
HB:	Bernard Toohey	Mark Turner	Geoff Valentine
C:	Brendan Way	Todd Bryant	Jason Lappin
HF:	Darren Harris	Stephen Clarke	Ross Hedley
F:	Gavin Chesser	Shayne Dryden	Simon Bone
Foll:	Scott Meyer	Craig Smith	Mark Doolan
Int:	Dustin Burns	Nic Conway	John House
Int:	Dean Heta (Emerg.)	Trent Storey (Emerg.)	Vin Glass (Emerg.); Heath Mooney (Emerg.)
Coach:	Darren Harris		

== Premierships ==
Competition	Level	Wins	Year won
Tallangatta & DFNL	Football		
Tallangatta & DFNL	Seniors Premierships	1	1987
Tallangatta & DFNL	Third's Premiership	2	1981, 1987
Tallangatta & DFNL	Third's Runners-up	1	1980
Ovens & Murray FNL	Seniors Premierships	1	1998
Ovens & Murray FNL	Seniors Runners-Up	1	1997
Ovens & Murray FNL	Reserves Premierships	7	1991, 1997, 1998, 1999, 2002, 2003, 2017
Ovens & Murray FNL	Reserve Runners-Up	5	1995, 1996, 2000, 2004, 2018
Ovens & Murray FNL	Under 18's Premierships	3	1989, 1994, 2010
Ovens & Murray FNL	Under 18's Runners-Up	3	1991, 1997, 2009
Ovens & Murray FNL	Netball		
Ovens & Murray FNL	B-Grade Runners-Up	1	2005
Ovens & Murray FNL	C-Grade Runners-Up	3	2000, 2005
Ovens & Murray FNL	Under 16 Runners-Up	3	2013, 2016, 2018

- The Demons won their first and only senior T&D premiership in 1987 when they defeated the Mitta United Football Club at the Sandy Creek Oval. (15.13.103 - 14.13.97)
- The Raiders won their first and only senior O&M premiership in 1998 when they defeated the Lavington Football Club at the Lavington Sports Ground. (19.12.126 - 8.14.62)
