= George Barton (footballer) =

Australian rules footballer

Personal information
- Full name: George Alexander Barton
- Born: 23 August 1934; Tawonga, Victoria
- Died: 5 May 1977 (aged 42)
- Original teams: Tawonga, Myrtleford
- Height: 178 cm (5 ft 10 in)
- Weight: 83 kg (183 lb)

Playing career^{1}
| Years | Club | Games (Goals) |
| 1949-53 | Tawonga | ? (?) |
| 1954-55 | Myrtleford | ? (21) |
| 1956 | Hawthorn | 9 (0) |
- ^{1} Playing statistics correct to the end of 1956.

George Alexander Barton (23 August 1934 - 5 May 1977) was an Australian rules footballer who played with Hawthorn in the Victorian Football League (VFL).

Barton was born in Tawonga and was the brother of Colin Barton, who played with Geelong Football Club and Bill Barton who played with North Melbourne Football Club. George Barton started playing senior football for Tawonga in the Yackandandah & District Football League at 14 in 1949. Barton was then recruited by Myrtleford in the Ovens & Murray Football League in 1954.

After two season with Myrtleford, Hawthorn recruited Barton and he was included on their 1956 playing list. Barton made his senior VFL debut in round seven, 1956 against Fitzroy at Glenferrie Oval at 21 years of age. Barton was named as Hawthorn's best player in Hawthorn's 1956 round eight clash against Carlton and Barton's second VFL match.

Barton returned from Hawthorn to initially play with Myrtleford in 1957 and was appointed as their back up captain-coach in April 1957 after ex Melbourne Reserves footballer, Arthur Hayes was replaced due to injury. Barton then resigned two weeks later. Barton then played with Tawonga in the Tallangatta & District Football League from 1957 to 1959. Barton played with Bogong from 1960 and 1963 and then played with Bogong / Tawonga FC in the Tallangatta & District Football League when they merged in 1964. He continued to play with the newly merged club of Tawonga - Bogong from 1964 until he retired in the mid 1970s. Barton then coached Dederang-Mt Beauty Reserves to a premiership in 1976.

The Tallangatta & District Football League senior football best and fairest award was changed to the Barton Medal in 1977, after three times senior football best and fairest winner (1962, 1963 and 1971). Barton also won the 1970 Tallangatta & District Football League Reserves football best and fairest award.

George Barton died of cancer in 1977.

Barton's brothers, Colin Barton and Bill Barton also played VFL football.
