= Don Wilks =

Australian rules footballer, born 1917

Personal information
- Full name: Donald John Wilks
- Born: 9 August 1917; West Melbourne, Victoria
- Died: 18 November 1983 (aged 66); Wantirna, Victoria
- Original team: Camberwell
- Height: 173 cm (5 ft 8 in)
- Weight: 82 kg (181 lb)
- Position: Back Pocket / Halfback

Playing career^{1}
Years	Club	Games (Goals)
1943–45	Hawthorn	51 (3)
- ^{1} Playing statistics correct to the end of 1945.

Donald John Wilks (9 August 1917 – 18 November 1983) was a former Australian rules footballer who played with Hawthorn in the Victorian Football League (VFL).

Wilks coached Echuca to the 1946 Echuca Football League premiership.

Wilks coached Auburn to three successive premierships from 1947 to 1949.

He coached North Albury Football Club in 1950 in the Ovens and Murray Football League, losing the grand final to Wangaratta.

In 1951 and 1952, Wilks coached Maryborough in the Ballarat Football League.
