= Ross Henshaw =

Australian rules footballer

Personal information
- Born: 13 August 1952 (age 74)
- Original team: North Albury (OMFL)
- Height: 189 cm (6 ft 2 in)
- Weight: 87 kg (192 lb)

Playing career^{1}
| Years | Club | Games (Goals) |
| 1971–1983 | North Melbourne | 167 (11) |
- ^{1} Playing statistics correct to the end of 1983.

Career highlights
- North Melbourne premiership player 1975, 1977

Ross Henshaw (born 13 August 1952) is a former Australian rules footballer who played for North Melbourne in the VFL.

Henshaw was a tough defender and played in either the back pocket or half back flank for North Melbourne during the 1970s and into the early 1980s. An attacking defender who teamed with David Dench, Frank Gumbleton, Ken Montgomery, Denis Pagan, Gary Farrant and Gary Cowton, to be part of one of the best defensive line ups for its era.

Henshaw held the VFL/AFL record for the most games played without polling Brownlow Medal vote, until it was passed by Jason Blake in 2010.
