= John Cooper (Australian footballer) =

Australian rules footballer (1933–2020)

Personal information
- Full name: John Kenneth Cooper
- Nickname: Jack
- Born: 23 May 1933; Yackandandah
- Died: 20 October 2020 (aged 87); Tawonga
- Original teams: Tawonga, Myrtleford
- Height: 183 cm (6 ft 0 in)
- Weight: 80 kg (176 lb)
- Position: Follower

Playing career^{1}
Years	Club	Games (Goals)
1956–57	Hawthorn	20 (17)
- ^{1} Playing statistics correct to the end of 1957.

John Cooper (23 May 1933 – 20 October 2020) was an Australian rules footballer who played with Hawthorn in the Victorian Football League (VFL).

Cooper won Myrtleford's best and fairest award in 1954 in his first year in the Ovens and Murray Football League, after being recruited from Tawonga.
