= Kergunyah =

- Town
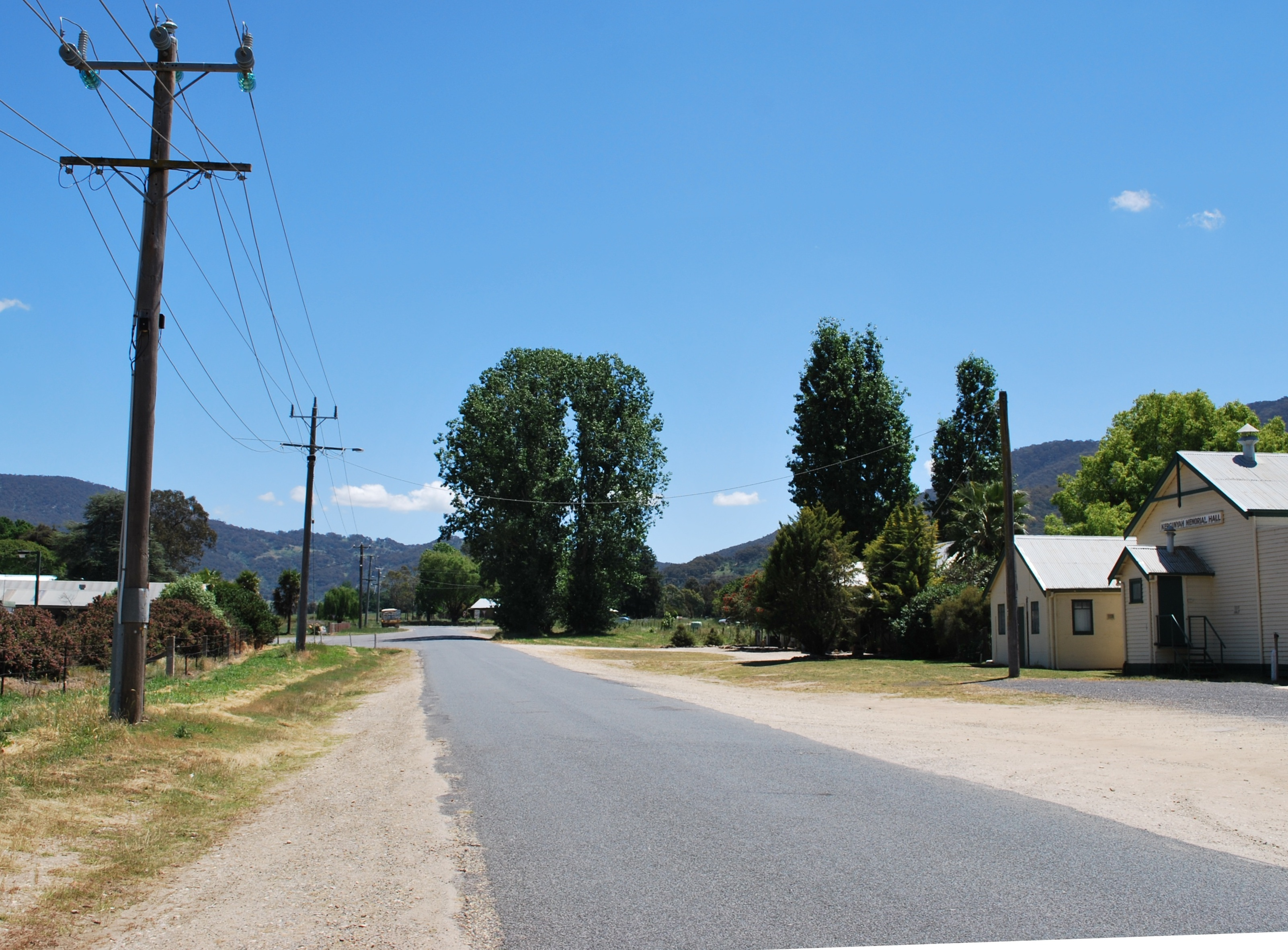
- Main street of Kergunyah

- Coordinates: 36°23′0″S 147°03′0″E
- Country: Australia
- State: Victoria
- Region: Hume
- LGA: Shire of Indigo
- Location: 353 km (219 mi) NE of Melbourne; 30 km (19 mi) SE of Wodonga; 28 km (17 mi) SW of Tallangatta

Government
  - State electorate: Benambra
  - Federal division: Indi

Population
  - Total: 215 (2016 census)
- Postcode: 3691

Kergunyah is a town in north eastern Victoria. The town is on the Kiewa Valley Highway, 353 kilometres (219 mi) north east of the state capital, Melbourne. At the 2016 census Kergunyah had a population of 215.

The town is a centre includes a post office agent, caravan park and general store, community hall and Uniting Church.

== Sport & Recreation ==
Kergunyah Football Club

The town was home to the Kergunyah Football Club which was established in 1923. They competed in several different local football leagues, including the Allans Flat District Football Association, the Yackandandah & District Football League, the "Dederang and District Football Association and the Tallangatta & District Football League.

During this time they competed in two Grand Finals, the 1928 Yackandandah & DFA Grade Grand Final where they were defeated by Yackandandah at Sandy Creek, and the 1937 Dederang & DFA Grand Final where they were defeated by Kiewa (10.5.65 - 11.9.75).

Before the 1940 season Kergunyah went into recess due to a lack of number because of the ongoing War, they continued to be in a state of recess until the 1944 post season. The club was re-activated during the 1945 pre-season, they continued to be based in the small township of Kergunyah, Victoria and chose to "Red and White colours" for its playing jumpers. They re-joined the Yackandandah & District Football League (formally known by "Yackandandah & District Football Association") for the 1945 season.

Kergunyah competed in the Yackandandah & District Football League until 1951. The club went into recess in 1952, prior to joining the neighbouring Tallangatta & District Football League in 1953.

The in 1954 the Yackandandah & District Football League folded due to lack of clubs.

Kergunyah was an early powerhouse in the Tallangatta & District Football League, becoming the first club to achieve a three-peat of premierships (1955-1956-1957), a record only equaled by Mitta United (1959-1960-1961). However by the early 1970s the club was in trouble, starved for on field success combined with not having very good facilities and with most players & club people residing in the Wodonga area. The tough decision was made following the 1975 season to disband the Kergunyah Football Club.

Kergunyah's three-peat record for most consecutive senior TDFL flags stood for 50-years before being beaten by Mitta United when they achieved the impressive feat of winning four consecutive senior TDFL flags (2004-2005-2006-2007).

After folding, a number of former players met to form a new club with Kergunyah being the Origins for the Wodonga Demons, later known as the Wodonga Raiders when they joined the Ovens & Murray Football League in 1988.
