= Kiewa-Sandy Creek Football Club =

Kiewa Sandy Creek FNC

Names
- Full name: Kiewa Sandy Creek Football Netball Club
- Nickname: Hawks

2025 season
- After finals: 1st
- Home-and-away season: 1st
- Leading goalkicker: Connor Newnham (107)
- Wayne Bartel Medal: Jacob Barber

Club details
- Founded: 1969; 57 years ago
- Colours: Brown Gold
- Competition: Tallangatta & DFNL
- President: Ross Scammell
- Coach: Zac Fulford
- Captain(s): Jack Di Mizio & Jacob Barber
- Premierships: (13): 1969, 1970, 1972, 1976, 1977, 1981, 1983, 1984, 1995, 2008, 2011, 2014, 2018, 2025
- Ground: Coulston Park, Tangambalanga (capacity: 5,000)

Uniforms
Home

Other information
- Official website: KSCFNC website

The Kiewa-Sandy Creek Football Netball Club, nicknamed the Hawks, is an Australian rules football club playing in the Tallangatta & District Football League. The club is based in the Victorian towns of Kiewa, Sandy Creek and Tangambalanga.

== History ==
In 1944, Sandy Creek were runners up to Fernvale in the grand final of the Mitta Valley Patriotic Football Association and the Association's best and fairest award was won by Fraser Paton from the Fernvale Football Club.

In 1950, the Kiewa Oval was undergoing extensive remodelling works and match days were played on a paddock near the butter factory.

Since 2000, the Kiewa Sandy Creek FNC have played in ten senior football Tallangatta & District Football League grand finals, winning four premierships.

== Club Timelines ==
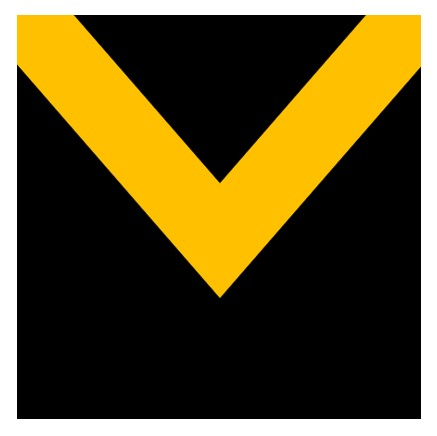
Sandy Creek FC

- Sandy Creek Football Club (1894 to 1968)
  - 1894 - 1898: Local games
  - 1899: Benambra Football Association
  - 1900 - 1905: Local games
  - 1906: Murphy's Albion Hotel (Yackandandah) Football Competition
  - 1907 - 1908: Tallangatta & District Football League
  - 1909: Dreadnought Football Club (Sandy Creek Football Club and Kiewa Football Club merged in 1909)
  - 1909: Twomey-Steward Football Association
  - 1910-1913: Club active playing local friendly matches
  - 1914: Wodonga & District Football League
  - 1915–1919: Club in recess due to World War One
  - 1920: Kiewa & District Football League
  - 1921–1926: Club in recess
  - 1927: Junior club active
  - 1928 - 32: Yackandandah & District Football Association
  - 1933–1934: Tallangatta & District Football League
  - 1935–1938: Dederang & District Football Association
  - 1940: Kiewa & Mitta Valleys Football League
  - 1941–1943: Club in recess, due to World War Two
  - 1944: Mitta Valley Patriotic Football Association
  - 1945–1946: Tallangatta & District Football League
  - 1947–1949: Yackandandah & District Football League
  - 1950–1968: Tallangatta & District Football League
- Kiewa Football Club
  - 1908: Tallangatta & District Football League
  - 1909: Dreadnought Football Club (Sandy Creek Football Club and Kiewa Football Club merged in 1909)
  - 1909: Twomey-Steward Football Association
  - 1914–1919: Club in recess
  - 1920–1921: Kiewa & District Football League
  - 1922–1923: Tallangatta & District Football League
  - 1924 & 1928: Albury & Border Football Association
  - 1929 - 1931: Yackandandah & District Football League
  - 1932 - ?
  - 1933: Tallangatta & District Football League
  - 1934: Chiltern & District Football Association
  - Kiewa FC
    1935–1939: Club in recess
  - 1940: Kiewa & Mitta Valleys Football League
  - 1941–1945: Club in recess, due to World War Two.
  - 1946–1951: Yackandandah & District Football League
  - 1952–1968: Tallangatta & District Football League
- Kiewa Rovers Football Club
  - 1932 - Yackandandah & District Football League
- Kiewa-Sandy Creek Football Club (Sandy Creek Football Club and Kiewa Football Club merged)
  - 1969–present: Tallangatta & District Football League

== Football Premierships ==
Kiewa FC

- Tallangatta & District Football Association
  - 1923 - Kiewa: 2.16 - 28 d Granya: 3.9 - 27
- Chiltern & District Football Association
  - 1934 - Kiewa Valley: 10.12 - 72 d Wodonga: 8.12 - 60
- Dederang & District Football Association
  - 1937 - Kiewa: 11.8 - 74 d Kergunyah: 10.5 - 65
- Yackandandah & District Football League
  - 1946 - Kiewa: 4.13 - 37 defeated Tawonga: 4.9 - 33
  - 1948 - Kiewa: 9.10 - 64 defeated Bogong: 4.14 - 38
  - 1949 - Kiewa: 7.8 - 50 defeated Yackandandah: 5.9 - 39

Sandy Creek FC

- Tallangatta Football Association
  - 1908 - Sandy Creek: 1.5 - 11 defeated Granya: 1.3 - 9
- Tallangatta Junior Football Association
  - 1934 - Sandy Creek: 15.5 - 95 d Tallangatta Rovers: 7.14 - 56

Kiewa Sandy Creek FC (1969 - to present day)

- Tallangatta & District Football League
  - Seniors
    - 1969, 1970, 1972, 1976, 1977, 1981, 1983, 1984, 1995, 2008, 2011, 2014, 2018, 2025

Reserves

- Tallangatta & District Football League
  - 1979, 1980, 1981, 1993, 2006, 2007, 2016, 2025

Thirds

- Tallangatta & District Football League
  - 1985, 1997, 2003, 2006, 2011

Fourths

- Tallangatta & District Football League
  - 1982, 2004, 2005, 2006,

== Netball Premierships ==
- Tallagatta & District Netball Association
  - A. Grade (9)
    - 1980, 1981, 1994, 1995, 1996, 2008, 2019, (2021:1st), 2023.
  - B. Grade (8)
    - 1993, 1994, 1995, 2008, 2019, (2021:1st), 2022, 2023.
  - C. Grade (2)
    - 2013, 2023.
  - 18's & Under (3)
    - 2002, 2005, 2014.
  - 15's & Under (2)
    - 1999, 2012
  - 13's & Under (7)
    - 1994, 1996, 1997, 2000, 2001, 2002, 2011.

== Club Best & Fairest / Leading Goalkicker ==
Seniors

Football – KSCFNC SENIORS: 1969 to present

Year	Votes	Best & Fairest	Goals	Leading Goalkicker
1969				
2023				
2024		Connor Newnham	56	Connor Newnham

== League Best & Fairest Winners ==
Seniors

- Dederang & District Football Association
  - 1939 - Les Miller: Sandy Creek FC
- Yackandandah & District Football League
  - 1949: Albert Kemp - Sandy Creek FC
  - 1951: R Newton - Kiewa FC
- Tallangatta & District Football League
  - J A Paton Trophy (1945 to 1976)
    - 1952, 1956, 1957, 1958 - Albert Kemp: Sandy Creek FC
    - 1957 - Jack McNamara: Kiewa FC
    - 1959 - Neville Handley: Kiewa FC
- Tallangatta & District Football League
  - Barton Medal (1977 - present day)
    - 1986 - C Andrews: Kiewa Sandy Creek FC

== Kiewa & District Football Association ==
Dating back to 1902, there has been a number intermittent football competitions in the Kiewa Valley and below is a list of the grand final teams and scores.

Grand Final Scores

- Kiewa & District Football Association
  - 1902 - Running Creek: 3.4 - 22 d Gundowring: 1.6 - 12
  - 1903 -
  - 1904 - Yackandandah: 6.7 - 43 d Gundowring: 3.14 - 32
- Kiewa Valley Football Association
  - 1913 - Mongan's Creek: 3.5 - 23 d Dederang: 2.6 - 18
  - 1914 - Dederang: 3.9 - 27 d Running Creek: 2.8 - 20
  - 1920 - Tallangatta: 7.13 - 55 defeated Kiewa: 2.4 - 16
  - 1920 - Dederang: 4.7 - 31 d Gundowring: 2.5 - 17 (Ellis Trophy)
- Kiewa & District Football Association
  - 1924 - Dederang: 7.14 - 54 d Tangam Rovers: 4.10 - 34
  - 1924 - Dederang Juniors: 7.11 - 53 d Kiewa Juniors: 4.8 - 32
  - 1925 - Tallangatta: 13.10 - 88 defeated Allan's Flat: 8.9 - 57
  - 1926 - Granya: 4.18 - 42 d Bethanga: 5.8 - 38
  - 1927 - Granya: 8.11 - 59 d Bethanga: 3.1 - 19
  - 1928 - Mitta Valley: 12.8 - 80 d Granya: 4.11 - 35
- Kiewa & Mitta Valleys Football League (1940)
  - 1940 - Mitta Valley: 14.7 - 91 d Kiewa: 6.7 - 43
