= Tim Broomhead =

Australian rules footballer

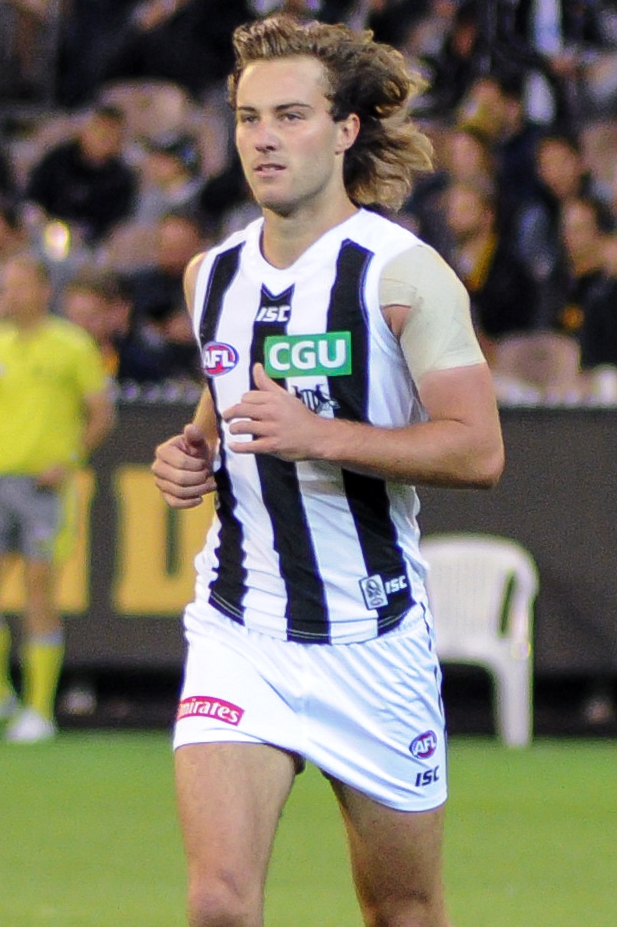
- Broomhead playing for Collingwood in March 2017

Personal information
- Full name: Tim Broomhead
- Born: 22 March 1994 (age 32)
- Original team: Port Adelaide (SANFL)
- Draft: No. 20, 2012 AFL draft, Collingwood
- Height: 184 cm (6 ft 0 in)
- Weight: 77 kg (170 lb)
- Position: Midfielder

Club information
- Current club: North Albury, Ovens & Murray FNL
- Number: 7

Playing career^{1}
Years	Club	Games (Goals)
2013–2020	Collingwood	37 (27)
- ^{1} Playing statistics correct to the end of the 2020 season.

Career highlights
- 2015 AFL Rising Star nominee

Tim Broomhead (born 22 March 1994) is a professional Australian rules football player who last played for the Collingwood in the Australian Football League (AFL).

== State football ==
Broomhead played junior football with Port District from 2004 until 2010. He joined Port Adelaide Magpies at under-14 level and then made 10 senior appearances in the South Australian National Football League (SANFL) during the 2012 season. At the same time he represented South Australia at the 2012 AFL Under 18 Championships, being selected as one of the best players in their first match against Tasmania, and averaging over the tournament 15.2 disposals with 77 percent efficiency.

== AFL career ==
Broomhead was recruited by Collingwood with draft pick number 20 in the 2012 AFL draft. Due to getting glandular fever during pre-season, he didn't play in the 2013 season, with Collingwood promoting Sam Dwyer from the rookie list in his place. The next season, Broomhead broke his wrist in the 2014 NAB Challenge, and made his debut only in Round 13 of the 2014 season, coming on as a substitute against Western Bulldogs at Etihad Stadium. Broomhead remained in the side for the following game against Hawthorn and started as the substitute again but came on early during the second quarter replacing Tom Langdon with concussion. In round 11 of the 2015 season, Broomhead was nominated for the Rising Star Award, after helping Collingwood beat Greater Western Sydney by 42 points at the Melbourne Cricket Ground, collecting 25 possessions, three tackles, and kicking a goal. Due to injuries, Broomhead managed to play only two games in the 2016 season, and then played 14 games in the 2017 season. In round 2 of the 2018 season, against Greater Western Sydney at the Melbourne Cricket Ground, Broomhead broke the tibia and fibula bones in his leg when he kicked the goalpost after attempting to soccer the ball through. At the conclusion of the season, Collingwood delisted Broomhead, stating they will re-draft him as a rookie if he is available. A month later, Collingwood re-drafted Broomhead as a rookie with pick 17 of the 2018 rookie draft, while he was still overcoming his broken leg. In April 2019, Broomhead returned to playing football via the Victorian Football League (VFL), playing in the opening round of the 2019 season against Coburg. Despite not playing for the senior side, he averaged 15.7 disposals and kicked 10 goals in 18 appearances for the VFL side, leading to Collingwood signing him on a one-year contract extension at the end of the season.

Broomhead was delisted by Collingwood at the conclusion of the 2020 season.

== Statistics ==
Statistics are correct to the end of the 2020 season

Legend
G	Goals	K	Kicks	D	Disposals	T	Tackles
B	Behinds	H	Handballs	M	Marks

Season	Team	No.	Games	Totals							Averages (per game)						
Season	Team	No.	Games	G	B	K	H	D	M	T	G	B	K	H	D	M	T
2013	Collingwood	29	0	—	—	—	—	—	—	—	—	—	—	—	—	—	—
2014	Collingwood	29	8	9	4	60	43	103	21	19	1.1	0.5	7.5	5.4	12.9	2.6	2.4
2015	Collingwood	29	11	7	5	81	79	160	16	39	0.6	0.5	7.4	7.2	14.5	1.5	3.5
2016	Collingwood	29	2	3	0	5	11	16	3	3	1.5	0	2.5	5.5	8.0	1.5	1.5
2017	Collingwood	29	14	8	11	100	129	229	47	35	0.6	0.8	7.1	9.2	16.4	3.4	2.5
2018	Collingwood	29	1	0	0	0	0	0	0	0	0.0	0.0	0.0	0.0	0.0	0.0	0.0
2019	Collingwood	29	0	—	—	—	—	—	—	—	—	—	—	—	—	—	—
2020	Collingwood	29	1	0	0	2	5	7	0	2	0.0	0.0	2.0	5.0	7.0	0.0	2.0
Career			37	27	20	248	267	515	87	98	0.7	0.5	6.7	7.2	13.9	2.4	2.6
