= Vern Drake =

Australian rules footballer

Personal information
- Full name: Vern Drake
- Born: 16 April 1946 (age 80)
- Original team: Geelong Reserves
- Height: 183 cm (6 ft 0 in)
- Weight: 79 kg (174 lb)

Playing career^{1}
Years	Club	Games (Goals)
1966	Fitzroy	2 (0)
- ^{1} Playing statistics correct to the end of 1966.

Vern Drake (born 16 April 1946) is a former Australian rules footballer who played with Fitzroy in the Victorian Football League (VFL) in the number 41 jumper.

Drake spent 1967 playing under Fred Wooller in Tasmania with the Penguin Football Club.

Drake was captain-coach of Arian Park / Mirrool Football Club in the South West Football League (New South Wales) in 1968, then moved onto coach Shepparton United Football Club in 1969. He then coached Benalla Football Club from 1970 to 1972. In 1972, Drake kicked 111 goals for Benalla during the home and away season.

Drake then coached Cooee Football Club to the 1973 North Western Football Union premiership.

Drake was later captain coach of North Albury Football Club from 1975 to 1977, eventually kicking 617 goals in the Ovens & Murray Football League, which included his goals kicked at Benalla.

Drake later settled in Albury and established the Vern Drake Real Estate business.
