= Michael Porter (footballer) =

Australian rules footballer (born 1945)

Personal information
- Born: 4 May 1945 (age 81)
- Original teams: Haileybury College, University Blacks
- Height: 180 cm (5 ft 11 in)
- Weight: 86 kg (190 lb)

Playing career^{1}
Years	Club	Games (Goals)
1966–1972	Hawthorn	78 (59)
- ^{1} Playing statistics correct to the end of 1972.

Career highlights
- 1971 VFL premiership player

Michael Porter (born 4 May 1945) is a former Australian rules footballer who played with Hawthorn in the VFL.

Porter was a half back flanker but he could also play on the half forward flanks. He was recruited to Hawthorn from Haileybury College and was a member of their 1971 - VFL grand final premiership team.

Porter was captain - coach of North Albury in the Ovens & Murray Football League and kicked 58 goals between 1973 and 1975.

In 2024, Porter was incorrectly included in the In memoriam segment during the annual Australian Football Hall of Fame induction ceremony, despite still being alive.
