= Graeme MacKenzie =

Australian rules footballer

Graeme Mackenzie
- McKenzie in 1962

Personal information
- Full name: Graeme Mackenzie
- Born: 8 March 1935
- Died: 16 September 2016 (aged 81)
- Original team: Edenhope
- Height: 175 cm (5 ft 9 in)
- Weight: 78 kg (172 lb)
- Position: Defence

Playing career^{1}
Years	Club	Games (Goals)
1956, 1958–62	Fitzroy	105 (1)
- ^{1} Playing statistics correct to the end of 1962.

Graeme MacKenzie (8 March 1935 – 16 September 2016) was an Australian rules footballer who played with Fitzroy in the Victorian Football League.

MacKenzie was a member of Fitzroy's 1959 Night Premiership.

MacKenzie was captain-coach of North Albury in the Ovens and Murray Football League from 1963 to 1965.
