= Rudy Yonson =

Australian rules footballer

Personal information
- Full name: Rudy Yonson
- Born: 20 September 1963 (age 63)
- Original team: North Albury
- Height: 176 cm (5 ft 9 in)
- Weight: 73 kg (161 lb)

Playing career^{1}
Years	Club	Games (Goals)
1985	Sydney	3 (3)
- ^{1} Playing statistics correct to the end of 1985.

Rudy Yonson (born 20 September 1963) is a former Australian rules footballer who played for Sydney in the Victorian Football League (VFL).

== Australian rules football career ==
Yonson made his VFL debut in Sydney's 1985 round 15 loss to Hawthorn at Princes Park. He scored two goals in that game. He played a further two games for Sydney – the round 16 match against Collingwood at the SCG, where he scored another goal, and the round 17 match against Footscray at the Western Oval.

Yonson played in North Albury's 1984 Ovens & Murray Football League premiership and won the 1984 O&MFL Morris Medal.

== Later life ==
Yonson currently runs a real estate business in Albury.
