= Brett Yorgey =

Australian rules footballer and coach

Personal information
- Full name: Brett Yorgey
- Born: 13 October 1960 (age 66)
- Original teams: Tumut, North Albury, Perth (WAFL)
- Height: 183 cm (6 ft 0 in)
- Weight: 82 kg (181 lb)

Playing career^{1}
Years	Club	Games (Goals)
1980	North Albury	? (13)
1981	South Melbourne	
1982 - 1986, 1988	Perth	65 (44)
1987	Collingwood	11 (7)
1989-1991	Port Melbourne	13 (16)
- ^{1} Playing statistics correct to the end of 1987.

Career highlights
- 1980 O&MFNL premiership

Brett Yorgey (born 13 October 1960) is a former Australian rules footballer who played with Collingwood in the Victorian Football League (VFL).

Yorgey played his early football at Tumut and won the 1976 Farrer Football League Under 17's best and fairest award before moving onto North Albury Football Club, playing in their 1980 Ovens & Murray Football League premiership and kicked 13 goals for the season.

His first stint in the VFL, at South Melbourne was in 1981, didn't result in a senior game. Yorgey then played with Perth in the Western Australian Football League (WAFL) between 1982 and 1986, then in 1988.

Yorgey then joined Collingwood in 1987 and made his senior debut, against Geelong at Waverley Park mid-season. On debut, Yorgey had 19 disposals, and kicked two goals and two behinds. He appeared in all of Collingwood's remaining games for the year, except their last.

In 1989, Yorgey was captain-coach of Port Melbourne. They finished the season in eighth position and after falling to 10th the following year, the former Collingwood player was replaced by Doug Searl.
