= Tylar Young =

Australian rules footballer

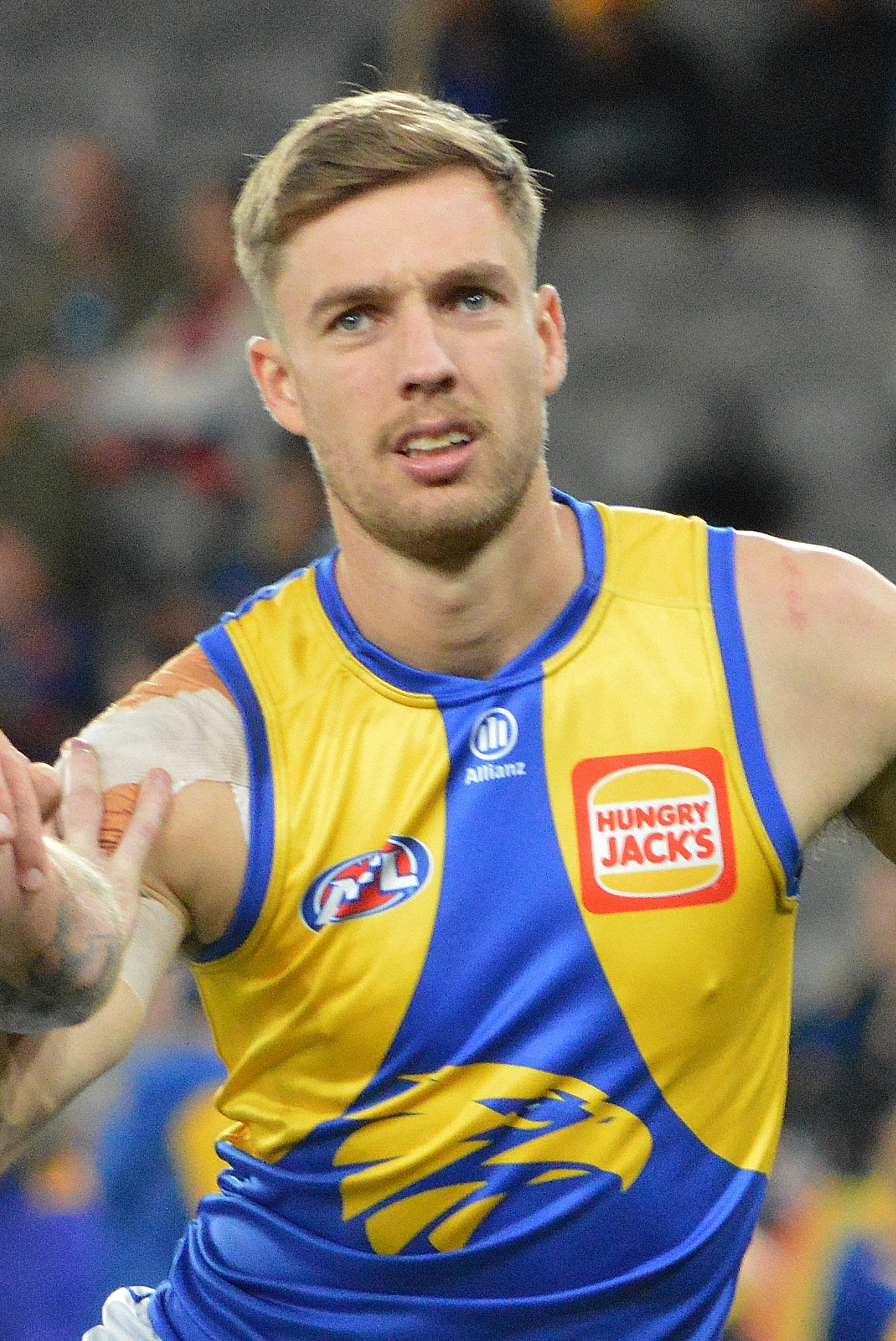
- Young with West Coast in May 2026

Personal information
- Born: 5 September 1998 (age 28)
- Original teams: North Albury, Richmond VFL
- Draft: No. 26, 2023 rookie draft: Richmond
- Debut: Round 2, 2023, Richmond vs. Adelaide, at Adelaide Oval
- Height: 196 cm (6 ft 5 in)
- Weight: 96 kg (212 lb)
- Position: Key defender

Club information
- Current club: West Coast
- Number: 20

Playing career^{1}
Years	Club	Games (Goals)
2023–2025	Richmond	35 (0)
2026–	West Coast	23 (0)
Total		58 (0)
- ^{1} Playing statistics correct to the end of 2026.

Tylar Young (born 5 September 1998) is a professional Australian rules footballer playing for the West Coast Eagles in the Australian Football League (AFL). Young previously played for Richmond and was drafted with the 26th pick in the 2023 rookie draft and made his AFL debut in round 2 of the 2023 season.

== Early life, junior and state-league football ==
Young played junior football until the age of 12, at which point he gave away the sport in favour of pursuing high level soccer aspirations through his teenage years. He returned to competition football at age 20, joining North Albury in 2019. After just six games, he was recruited by Frankston to make his debut in the VFL that same season, before joining the club on a full time basis from 2020. The season was ultimately cancelled due to community restrictions in place during the COVID-19 pandemic, so Young's first matches with Frankston would wait until 2021. After one season, he moved to join the VFL program of AFL club Richmond, where he played 14 matches in the 2022 season.

== AFL career ==
=== Richmond ===
Young was drafted by Richmond with the club's second pick and the 26th selection overall in the 2023 rookie draft.

He made his AFL debut in round 2 of the 2023 season. Young drew acclaim for his pure defensive abilities that season, recording a remarkably low contested one-on-one loss rate, ranking him second among all key defenders in the league (with 14.3 per cent) after 17 rounds.

Young played 35 games for Richmond over three seasons.

=== West Coast ===
Young requested a trade to West Coast for the 2026 season, and his request was granted on 13 October 2025, signing a three-year deal.

== Statistics ==
Updated to the end of round 22, 2026.

Legend
G	Goals	K	Kicks	D	Disposals	T	Tackles
B	Behinds	H	Handballs	M	Marks

Season	Team	No.	Games	Totals							Averages (per game)							Votes
Season	Team	No.	Games	G	B	K	H	D	M	T	G	B	K	H	D	M	T	Votes
2023	Richmond	45	19	0	0	129	48	177	55	23	0.0	0.0	6.8	2.5	9.3	2.9	1.2	0
2024	Richmond	45	9	0	0	63	19	82	41	8	0.0	0.0	7.0	2.1	9.1	4.6	0.9	0
2025	Richmond	45	7	0	0	78	20	98	47	4	0.0	0.0	11.1	2.9	14.0	6.7	0.6	0
2026	West Coast	20	21	0	0	207	67	274	115	19	0.0	0.0	9.9	3.2	13.0	5.5	0.9	0
Career			56	0	0	477	154	631	258	54	0.0	0.0	8.5	2.8	11.3	4.6	1.0	0
