= Bill Barton (footballer) =

Australian rules footballer

Personal information
- Full name: Bill Barton
- Born: 15 March 1936 (age 90)
- Original teams: Granya, North Albury
- Height: 182 cm (6 ft 0 in)
- Weight: 82 kg (181 lb)

Playing career^{1}
Years	Club	Games (Goals)
1955–56	North Melbourne	2 (2)
- ^{1} Playing statistics correct to the end of 1956.

Bill Barton (born 15 March 1936) is a former Australian rules footballer who played with North Melbourne in the Victorian Football League (VFL).

Bill went onto play a combined 484 senior games in the Tallangatta & District Football League, Ovens and Murray Football League, Farrer Football League and the Hume Football League, played in seven premierships and was coach in five premierships too - Jindera - 1964 and 1965, Brocklesby - 1969 and Walla Walla - 1973 and 1974. Barton also coached Mangoplah / Cookadinia and Burrumbuttock.

He was inducted into the Hume Football League - Hall of Fame in 2016.

Brother of Colin Barton, who played with Geelong Football Club and George Barton who played with Hawthorn Football Club.
