= Don Ross (footballer) =

Australian rules footballer (1934–2026)

Personal information
- Born: 20 February 1934
- Died: 15 July 2026 (aged 92)
- Original team: North Albury (OMFL)
- Height: 180 cm (5 ft 11 in)
- Weight: 83 kg (183 lb)

Playing career
| Years | Club | Games (Goals) |
| 1950–1951 & 1959–1962 | North Albury | 110 (55) |
| 1952–1958 | Footscray | 129 (20) |

Career highlights
- North Albury best & fairest: 1951; VFL premiership: 1954; Charles Sutton Medal: 1956; O&MFNL Hall of Fame: 2015; North Albury Hall of Fame: 2017; Footscray Hall of Fame: 2018

Donald Andrew Ross (20 February 1934 – 15 July 2026) was an Australian rules footballer who represented Footscray in the Victorian Football League (VFL).

== Biography ==
Originally from North Albury in the Ovens & Murray Football League where he played in North Albury's losing 1950 Ovens & Murray Football League grand final.

Ross played 16 VFL senior matches in 1952 and won Footscray's best first year player award.

He played as a centreman but was also used as a ruck-rover or at half forward for Footscray.

Ross played in Footscray's 1954 VFL Grand Final premiership win against Melbourne. He won Footscray's best and fairest award in 1956.

He returned home as captain-coach of North Albury from 1959 to 1962. Ross was runner up in the 1961 and 1962 Ovens & Murray Football League best and fairest award, the Morris Medal.

Ross was then captain-coach of Burrumbuttock Football Club in 1963 in the Hume Football League before retiring from football.

He was inducted into the Western Bulldogs Hall of Fame in 2018.

Ross died on 15 July 2026, at the age of 92. His son, Paul Ross played with Footscray in 1980.
