= Gerard Butts =

Australian rules footballer

Personal information
- Full name: Gerard Butts
- Born: 19 November 1966 (age 59)
- Original team: North Albury
- Height: 190 cm (6 ft 3 in)
- Weight: 84 kg (185 lb)

Playing career^{1}
| Years | Club | Games (Goals) |
| 1988–1989 | Carlton | 3 (0) |
- ^{1} Playing statistics correct to the end of 1989.

Gerard Butts (born 19 November 1966) is a former Australian rules footballer who played with Carlton in the Victorian Football League (VFL). After playing three games in two years with the Blues, Butts was delisted and moved to Tasmania to play with North Hobart.
