= Colin Barton =

Australian rules footballer

Personal information
- Full name: Colin Barton
- Born: 17 April 1937
- Original team: Albury
- Height: 180 cm (5 ft 11 in)
- Weight: 81 kg (179 lb)

Playing career^{1}
Years	Club	Games (Goals)
1955, 1957–59	Geelong	38 (0)
- ^{1} Playing statistics correct to the end of 1959.

Colin Barton (born 17 April 1937) is a former Australian rules footballer who played with Geelong in the Victorian Football League (VFL).

Barton was recruited from Albury in the Ovens and Murray Football League.

Brother of Bill Barton, who played with North Melbourne Football Club and George Barton who played with Hawthorn Football Club.
