= Mark Hylton =

Mark Hylton may refer to:

- Mark Hylton (sprinter) (born 1976), former British 400 metres sprinter
- Mark Hylton (darts player) (born 1966), English darts player

== See also ==
- Mark Hilton (disambiguation)
