= Alby Smedts =

Australian rules footballer

Personal information
- Full name: Albert Peter Smedts
- Born: 9 January 1952 (age 74)
- Original teams: Narre Warren, North Albury
- Height: 184 cm (6 ft 0 in)
- Weight: 79 kg (174 lb)
- Position: Defence

Playing career^{1}
Years	Club	Games (Goals)
1972–1975	Waverley (VFA)	
1975–1976	North Albury (OMFL)	
1976–1979	Footscray	51 (4)
1980–1981	St Kilda	10 (0)
- ^{1} Playing statistics correct to the end of 1981.

Albert Peter Smedts (born 9 January 1952) is a former Australian rules footballer who initially played for Narre Warren, then with Waverley in the VFA from 1972 to 1974.

Smedts played with North Albury in 1975 and 1976, kicking 15 goals, and featured in North Albury's best players in their 1975 Ovens & Murray Football League grand final loss to Wangaratta Rovers, prior to playing with Footscray from late 1976 to 1979.

Smedts then played with the St Kilda Football Club in the Victorian Football League (VFL) from 1980 to 1981.
