= John Leahy (footballer) =

Australian rules footballer

Personal information
- Full name: John Leahy
- Born: 7 March 1941; Geelong, Victoria
- Died: 23 November 1980 (aged 39); North Melbourne, Victoria
- Original team: North Albury
- Height: 188 cm (6 ft 2 in)
- Weight: 79 kg (174 lb)

Playing career^{1}
Years	Club	Games (Goals)
1961	Melbourne	2 (0)
- ^{1} Playing statistics correct to the end of 1960.

John Patrick Leahy (7 March 1941 – 23 November 1980) was an Australian rules footballer who played two senior games for Melbourne Football Club in the 1961 Victorian Football League (VFL) season.

== Early life ==
John Leahy was born in Geelong, Victoria to Alfred Ernest Leahy and Kathleen Leahy (née Gehrig) on 7 March 1941. He was one of four brothers, two of which also played for Melbourne during the 1960s – Brian played in the 1960 Melbourne Premiership team while Terry won Melbourne's best and fairest in 1966.

== Football career ==
Leahy joined his brother Brian at Melbourne in 1961, wearing the number 30 guernsey. He played two games – The Round 12 draw with Fitzroy and the Round 13 loss to Hawthorn.

== Later life ==
At age 21 John married Nancy Faye Arthur and later had two children – Philip and Rodney.

John Leahy died in North Melbourne on 23 November 1980. He was cremated three days later.

== See also ==
- List of Australian rules football families
