= Keith Shea =

Australian rules footballer and coach (1914–1951)

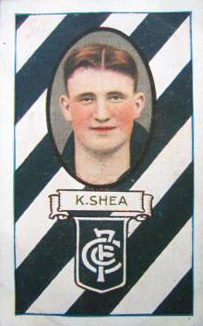

Personal information
- Full name: Keith Sylvester Shea
- Born: 10 August 1914; Bacchus Marsh, Victoria
- Died: 27 February 1951 (aged 36); Albury, New South Wales
- Original team: Bacchus Marsh
- Height: 175 cm (5 ft 9 in)
- Weight: 78 kg (172 lb)

Playing career
Years	Club	Games (Goals)
1932–1937	Carlton	91 (101)
1938–1939	Subiaco	37 (69)
1940	South Fremantle	17 (14)
1945	Hawthorn	8 (8)

Coaching career
Years	Club	Games (W–L–D)
1940	South Fremantle	22 (16–6–0)
1945–1946	Hawthorn	39 (9–30–0)

Keith Sylvester Shea (10 August 1914 – 27 February 1951) was an Australian rules footballer who played at high levels in both Victoria and Western Australia. His senior VFL playing career spanned from 1932 to 1945, although it was interrupted by the war and he continued on playing country football until 1950.

== Family ==
The son of Stephen Sylvester Shea (1890-1958), and Florence Kathleen Shea (1891-1958), née Dowling, Keith Sylvester Shea was born at Bacchus Marsh, Victoria on 10 August 1914.

He married Linda Jessie Elin Tuke (1914-1977) on 25 November 1940.

== Football ==
Shea was a half forward and played with Carlton from 1932 to 1937. He polled well in the Brownlow Medal, the closest he came to winning was in 1934 where he fell 2 votes short with an equal 3rd placing. Shea finished 3rd again the following season in 1935 and equal fourth in 1937.

He represented Victoria on 10 occasions during his time at Carlton. It was playing for Victoria in the 1937 Perth Carnival where he caught the eyes of the Subiaco Football Club recruiters who signed him up for the 1938 season, coached by Haydn Bunton. During his stint with Subiaco he played interstate football with Western Australia and polled 11 votes in the 1938 Sandover Medal. He was appointed coach of South Fremantle for the 1940 season.

In 1941 Shea had returned to Melbourne. He accepted the coaching position at North Melbourne but Carlton would not give him a clearance. He was still legally tied to South Fremantle whom themselves would not clear him back to Victoria. Shea was fined while as Publican of the Notting Hill Hotel for selling alcohol out of hours.

Shea returned to the VFL in 1945 as coach of Hawthorn on a three-year deal. When injuries got the better of him during the season, he became a non-playing coach. He retired as a player at the season's end but staying on as coach in 1946.

In 1947 he was captain-coach Rupanyup in the Wimmera Football League, then moved to Albury the following year when he was captain-coach of North Albury in 1948 and 1949, when they won the 1948 premiership of the Ovens and Murray Football League.

In 1950 he coached Griffith South West Football League (New South Wales), to a losing grand final.

Shea was reappointed coach of North Albury for the 1951 season but died.

== Death ==
Shea, who was a hairdresser by trade, died in the Albury Base Hospital on 27 February 1951, at the age of 37 following an operation in February 1951 in Albury, New South Wales. He had been ill for some time.
