= Geoff Doubleday =

Australian rules footballer

Personal information
- Full name: Geoff Doubleday
- Born: 28 January 1940
- Original team: North Albury
- Height: 189 cm (6 ft 2 in)
- Weight: 83 kg (183 lb)
- Position: Ruck

Playing career^{1}
Years	Club	Games (Goals)
1963	Fitzroy	1 (0)
- ^{1} Playing statistics correct to the end of 1963.

Geoff Doubleday (born 28 January 1940) is a former Australian rules footballer who played with Fitzroy in the Victorian Football League (VFL).

Doubleday was later captain-coach of Dederang & won the 1967 Tallangatta & District Football League best and fairest medal and was runner up in 1966 and in 1969 tied with the winner on votes, but was deemed second under the old count back system.
