= Terry Leahy (footballer) =

Australian rules footballer (1946–2002)

Personal information
- Full name: Terry Leahy
- Born: 12 October 1946
- Died: 29 November 2002 (aged 56)
- Original team: North Albury
- Height: 184 cm (6 ft 0 in)
- Weight: 81 kg (179 lb)

Playing career^{1}
Years	Club	Games (Goals)
1966–1967	Melbourne	26 (8)
1968–1970	South Melbourne	39 (9)
Total		65 (17)
- ^{1} Playing statistics correct to the end of 1970.

Career highlights
- Keith 'Bluey' Truscott Medal 1966

Terry Leahy (12 October 1946 – 29 November 2002) was an Australian rules footballer who played for Melbourne and South Melbourne in the VFL. His brothers John and Brian also played with Melbourne.

== Australian rules football career ==
On Monday, 25 April 1966, Terry Leahy made his VFL debut in Melbourne's Round 1 loss to St Kilda at the MCG. He continued to play all of Melbourne's 18 games for the year, kicking a total of six goals and earning one Brownlow Medal vote.

Leahy also won the Keith 'Bluey' Truscott Medal for being voted Melbourne's best and fairest during the 1966 season.

During the 1967 season Leahy only played eight games, kicking two goals in the process – one against Geelong in Round 2, the other during the Round 16 win against Footscray. Melbourne "dismissed" Leahy at the end of the 1967 season as a "disciplinary measure".

Leahy subsequently moved to South Melbourne for the 1968 season, where he remained until the end of his VFL career in 1970. In the 1968 season he played twelve games, kicked four goals and earned one Brownlow Medal vote. The following season he played 19 of South Melbourne's 20 games, kicking three goals and earning two Brownlow votes. In his final season he kicked two goals in the eight games played and did not play again after South Melbourne's Round 13 win over North Melbourne.

Leahy would go onto be captain-coach of Grong Grong Matong in 1971 and 1972 and represented New South Wales in 1972.

Leahy was captain-coach of Queanbeyan in the Canberra Australian National Football League in 1974 and Benalla in the Ovens & Murray Football League in 1975.

== Playing statistics ==
Legend
G	Goals	K	Kicks	D	Disposals	T	Tackles
B	Behinds	H	Handballs	M	Marks

Season	Team	No.	Games	Totals							Averages (per game)						
Season	Team	No.	Games	G	B	K	H	D	M	T	G	B	K	H	D	M	T
1966	Melbourne	19	18	6	13	250	30	280	38	—N/a	0.3	0.7	13.9	1.7	15.6	2.1	—N/a
1967	Melbourne	19	8	2	1	68	9	77	9	—N/a	0.3	0.1	8.5	1.1	9.6	1.1	—N/a
1968	South Melbourne	19	12	4	8	158	25	183	29	—N/a	0.3	0.7	13.2	2.1	15.3	2.4	—N/a
1969	South Melbourne	19	19	3	8	279	87	366	44	—N/a	0.2	0.4	14.7	4.6	19.3	2.3	—N/a
1970	South Melbourne	19	8	2	0	53	16	69	9	—N/a	0.3	0.0	6.6	2.0	8.6	1.1	—N/a
Career			65	17	30	808	167	975	129	—N/a	0.3	0.5	12.4	2.6	15.0	2.0	—N/a

== See also ==
- List of Australian rules football families
