= Tim Robb =

Australian rules footballer

Personal information
- Full name: Harold Warwick Robb
- Born: 17 December 1924; Yea, Victoria
- Died: 2 March 1985 (aged 60); Albury, New South Wales
- Original team: Yarraville (VFA)
- Height: 170 cm (5 ft 7 in)
- Weight: 72 kg (159 lb)

Playing career^{1}
Years	Club	Games (Goals)
1947–1949	Footscray	40 (63)
1949–1951	North Melbourne	34 (51)
Total		74 (114)

Coaching career
Years	Club	Games (W–L–D)
1952-1953	The Rock	
1954-1956	North Albury	
1957–1962	Wagga Tigers	
1963–1964	Collingullie	
1965–1967	North Wagga	
1969–1970	Wagga Tigers	
1971	North Albury	
1973-1975	Albury	
1978	Walbundrie	
1982	Lockhart	
- ^{1} Playing statistics correct to the end of 1982.

Career highlights
- VFA: 1946 Argus Newspaper VFA Footballer of the Year; VFL: 1950 VFL Grand Final: North Melbourne; O&MFL: 1955 O&MFL Premiership: North Albury; Farrer FL: 1957, 1958, 1959, 1961, 1962 Farrer FL Premierships: Wagga Tigers; Milbrulong FL: 1963, 1964 Milbrulong FL Premierships: Collingullie; Hume FL: 1978 Hume Football League Premiership: Walbundrie; 1982 Hume Football League Premiership: Lockhart

Harold Warwick "Tim" Robb (17 December 1924 – 2 March 1985) was an Australian rules footballer who played with Footscray and North Melbourne in the VFL.

Robb shared the 1946 Argus Cup newspaper award for the best and fairest player in the Victorian Football Association, when representing the Yarraville Football Club. Robb finished fourth in the 1946 VFA Recorder Cup trophy, with 23 votes.

Robb played as a rover and was also a capable goalkicker for his clubs. His first club was Footscray with whom he debuted in 1947 and spent two and a half seasons there. During the 1949 season he transferred to North Melbourne. He was a member of North Melbourne's inaugural 1950 VFL Grand Final team and kicked two goals in a losing cause.

Prior to playing VFL football, Robb served in both the Australian Army and the Royal Australian Navy during World War II.

Robb coached The Rock Football Club in 1952 & 1953 in the Albury & District Football League and was runner up in the league's best and fairest medal on a count back in 1952 and was runner up again in the medal in 1953.

Robb accepted the coaching position at North Albury in 1954. and was captain coach of their 1955 O&MFL premiership and were runners up in 1956.

Robb was captain-coach of the Ovens & Murray Football League Inter-league side that won the 1955 Victorian Country Football Championships in Albury.

Robb moved to Wagga as captain-coach of the Wagga Tigers and led them to five premierships, 1957, 1958, 1959, 1961 and 1962 and runners up in 1960. He then coached Collingullie to back to back Milbrulong Football League premierships in 1963 and 1964.

In 1960, Robb, a rover-forward topped the Farrer Football League goalkicking list with 69 goals ahead of Culcairn’s evergreen Harry “Splinter” Liston with 65.

Robb retired from playing after the 1967 football season.

Robb was captain coach of three teams in major leagues that made ten successive grand finals, between 1955 and 1964 for eight premierships!

Robb coached Walbundrie to a Hume Football League premiership in 1978 and then coached Lockhart to the 1981 Hume Football League premiership.
