= Brian Leahy =

Australian rules footballer (1943–2004)

Personal information
- Full name: Brian Peter Leahy
- Born: 3 February 1943
- Died: 24 January 2004 (aged 60); Wodonga, Victoria
- Original team: North Albury
- Height: 185 cm (6 ft 1 in)
- Weight: 83 kg (183 lb)
- Position: Half back

Playing career^{1}
Years	Club	Games (Goals)
1960–1965	Melbourne	79 (2)
- ^{1} Playing statistics correct to the end of 1965.

Career highlights
- Melbourne 1960 premiership side

Brian Peter 'Wrecker' Leahy (3 February 1943 – 24 January 2004) was an Australian rules footballer who played for Melbourne in the Victorian Football League (VFL) during the early 1960s. His brothers John and Terry also played for Melbourne.

== Australian rules football career ==
A strongly built half back, Leahy was noted for his bursts off the flanks. At age 15 he won the North Albury Football Club's best and fairest and was just 16 when signed up by Melbourne, spending 1959 in the reserves.

On 18 April 1960 during the Round 1 clash with North Melbourne, Leahy became the 786th player to wear the Melbourne guernsey. He went on to play a further 11 matches with Melbourne during the 1960 season, including the Grand Final against Collingwood. At 17 years and 233 days Brian became the second youngest premiership player in VFL history, just 11 days older than the record holder Murray Weideman.

During the 1961 season, Leahy played a total of 17 matches – two with his older brother, John (Rounds 12 and 13) – and received two votes for the Brownlow Medal. He played another 17 matches in 1962, including the Semi-Final loss to Carlton and received another Brownlow Medal vote.

Leahy played a total of 18 games during the 1963 season and kicked his first VFL goal during the Round 7 loss to South Melbourne. In 1964 he kicked his second goal against South Melbourne (Round 11) before a thigh injury cost him another premiership.

A torn Achilles tendon the following season ultimately ended Leahy's VFL career – he played only one game in 1965 – the Round 16 loss to Geelong.

Leahy finished his career in the Victorian Football Association (VFA) where he played briefly with both Yarraville and Northcote. He then coached South Melbourne's Under-19s football team.

== Later life ==
Brian Leahy died in Wodonga on 24 January 2004 and is buried at the Glenmorous Gardens Lawn Cemetery, Albury.

== See also ==
- List of Australian rules football families
