= Darren Handley =

Australian rules footballer

Personal information
- Full name: Darren James Handley
- Born: 18 December 1963 (age 62); Mount Beauty
- Original teams: Dederang-Mt Beauty, Myrtleford
- Height: 177 cm (5 ft 10 in)
- Weight: 76 kg (168 lb)

Playing career^{1}
Years	Club	Games (Goals)
1986	Collingwood	12 (10)
1987–1988	Fitzroy	10 (7)
Total		22 (17)
- ^{1} Playing statistics correct to the end of 1988.

Darren Handley (born 18 December 1963) is a former Australian rules footballer who played with Collingwood and Fitzroy in the Victorian Football League (VFL).

Originally playing for Dederang-Mt Beauty Football Club then moved onto Myrtleford, Handley played one season at Collingwood, in 1986. He debuted in round 10 and missed only one game for the rest of the year. His best performance came in Collingwood's win over Fitzroy at Waverley Park, earning three Brownlow Medal votes for 28 disposals and four goals.

Handley played 10 games for Fitzroy, two in 1987 and eight in 1988. He announced in 1989 that he was taking a break from football in order to recover from a chronic groin injury.

He coached Victorian Amateur Football Association club Old Essendon Grammarians in 2006 and 2007.
