= Paul Ross (footballer) =

Australian rules footballer

Personal information
- Born: 9 November 1960 (age 65)
- Original team: North Albury
- Height: 183 cm (6 ft 0 in)
- Weight: 80 kg (176 lb)

Playing career^{1}
Years	Club	Games (Goals)
1980	Footscray	3 (1)
- ^{1} Playing statistics correct to the end of 1980.

Paul Ross (born 9 November 1960) is a former Australian rules footballer who played with Footscray in the Victorian Football League (VFL).

His father, Don Ross also played with Footscray in the 1950s.
