= Dederang-Mt Beauty Football Club =

Australian rules football and netball club

Dederang Mount Beauty

Names
- Full name: Dederang Mount Beauty Football Netball Club
- Nickname: Bombers

2023 season
- After finals: N/A
- Home-and-away season: 9th of 12
- Leading goalkicker: Cody Hewat: 49
- Best and fairest: Jordan Harrington

Club details
- Founded: 1891; 135 years ago
- Colours
- Competition: Tallangatta & DFNL
- President: Richard Kreuzer
- Coach: 2024: Tom McGhee & Jaydn Chalmbers
- Premierships: Dederang: 8; Tawonga: 6; Bogong: 4; Bogong/Tawonga: 0, Dederang/Mt. Beauty: 3
- Ground: Dederang Football Ground, 4454 Kiewa Hwy, Dederang, 3691. (capacity: 5,000)

Uniforms
Home

Other information
- Official website: Dederang / Mt. Beauty FNC website

The Dederang Mount Beauty Football Netball Club, nicknamed the Bombers, is an Australian rules football and netball club based in Dederang, Victoria. Dederang teams currently play in the Tallangatta & District Football League.

== Individual Club Histories ==
Dederang FC Colours:1919&23

Below are brief histories of each club's football competition timelines, grand finals results, league best and fairest winners and some links to team photos from the following clubs - Dederang, Tawonga, Bogong, Bogong / Tawonga and Dederang / Mount Beauty.

There was a Dederang & District Football Association that ran from 1932 to 1939, with the grand final results listed below.

When Dederang FC left the Dederang & DFA in 1940, the Association changed its name at their AGM to the Kiewa & Mitta Football League.

== Dederang Football Club (1891 - 1975) ==
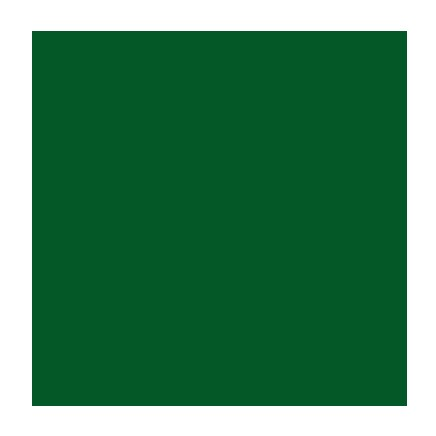
Dederang FC Colours

Football Timeline

- 1891-1911: Club formed in 1891. No official competition football until 1912.
- 1912: Yackandandah Football Association
- 1913-1915: Kiewa Valley Football Association
- 1916-1918: Club in recess due to World War I
- 1919: No official competition, but Dederang won eight and lost one game.
- 1920: Kiewa Valley Football Association
- 1921 - 1922: No official competition, but several friendly matches were played.
- 1923: Allans Flat & District Football Association
- 1924–1926: Kiewa & District Football Association
- 1927–1931: ? Dederang applied to play in the Bright District Football Association in 1931, but were refused entry.
- 1932-1937: Dederang & District Football Association
- 1938: Club in recess
- 1939: Dederang & District Football Association
- 1940: Yackandandah & District Football League
- 1941 - 1945: ? In recess > World War II
- 1946–48:Yackandandah & District Football League
- 1949: No senior team
- 1950-1953: Yackandandah & District Football League
- 1954: No senior team, but Dederang Juniors played a number of matches against other local teams.
- 1955–1975: Tallangatta & District Football League
- 1976 - Merged with the Bogong-Tawonga FC to form the Dederang / Mt. Beauty FNC

Football Premierships / Runners Up (Grand Finals)

- Yackandandah Football Association
  - 1912 - Dederang:4.7 - 31 d Yackandandah: 1.6 - 12
- Kiewa Valley Football Association
  - 1913 - Mongan's Creek: 3.5 - 23 d Dederang: 2.6 - 18
  - 1914 - Dederang: 3.9 - 27 d Running Creek: 2.8 - 20 Dederang wore blue, white and red colours in this match.
  - 1920 - Dederang: 4.7 - 31 d Gundowring: 2.5 - 17
- Allans Flat & District Football Association
  - 1923 - Allan's Flats: 3.5 - 23 d Dederang: 0.6 - 6
- Kiewa & District Football Association
  - 1924 - Dederang: 7.14 - 54 d Tangam Rovers: 4.10 - 34
  - 1924 - Dederang Juniors: 7.11 - 53 d Kiewa Juniors: 4.8 - 32
  - 1925:
- Dederang & District Football Association
  - 1933 - Dederang: defeated Mudgegonga: by two points
- Tallangatta & District Football League
  - 1958 - Dederang: 11.3 - 69 d Mitta United: 10.7 - 67
  - 1962 - Dederang: 5.7 - 37 drew with Bogong: 4.13 - 37
  - 1962 - Dederang: 10.13 - 73 d Bogong: 8.10 - 58 (Grand Final replay)
  - 1967 - Mitta United: 11.9 - 75 d Dederang: 8.6 - 54
  - 1968 - Mitta United: 11.9 - 75 d Dederang: 11.8 - 74 at Sandy Creek

Dederang & District Football Association (1932 to 1939)
Grand Finals

- 1932 - Tawonga: 7.9 - 51 d Mudgegonga: 3.11 - 29 at Dederang
- 1933 - Dederang: defeated Mudgegonga: by two points at Tawonga
- 1934 - Tawonga:
- 1935 - Eskdale: defeated Tawonga: by 4 goals at Sandy Creek.
- 1936 - Tawonga: 12.5 - 77 d Yackandandah: 9.13 - 67 at Sandy Creek.
- 1937 - Kiewa: 11.8 - 74 d Kergunyah: 10.5 - 65 at Sandy Creek.
- 1938 - Eskdale: 16.14 - 110 d Kiewa: 5.6 - 36 at Sandy Creek.
- 1939 - Tallangatta: 6.12 - 48 defeated Kiewa: 2.9 - 21

Kiewa & Mitta Football League (1940)

- 1940 - Mitta Valley: 14.7 - 91 d Kiewa: 6.7 - 43

League Best & Fairest Awards

Senior Football

- Tallangatta & District Football League
  - 1961 - Errol Barton
  - 1967 - Geoff Doubleday
  - 1969 - Geoff Doubleday: Tied with the winner on 20 votes, but finished as runner up on the old countback system and has never received a retrospective medal from the T&DFNL.

== Tawonga Football Club (1891 - 1963) ==
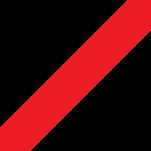
Tawonga FC Jumper: 1950

Timeline

- 1891 - Tawonga FC v Freedom Brothers FC
- 1901 - Bright & District Football Association
- 1902 - Kiewa Valley Football Association
- 1912 - Club active. Won all the games in 1912.
- 1913 - 1914: Kiewa Valley Football Association
- 1915 - 1919: Club in recess due to World War I
- 1920: Club active, but no official competition matches.
- 1921: ? Football Association involving - Dederang, Gundowring and Tawonga, but no records of match results in local papers.
- 1922 - 1925: club appears to be in recess.
- 1926 - 1928: Bright District Football League
- 1929 & 1930: Yackandandah & District Football League
- 1931: Bright District Football Association
- 1932 - 1938: Dederang & District Football Association
- 1939 – 1940: Myrtleford-Bright Football League
- 1941 - 1945: Club in recess > World War II
- 1946 – 1953: Yackandandah & District Football League
- 1954 – 1963: Tallangatta & District Football League

Football Premierships / Runners Up (Grand Finals)

- Dederang & District Football Association
  - 1932 - Tawonga: 7.9 - 51 d Mudgegonga: 3.11 - 29
  - 1934 - Tawonga
  - 1935 - Eskdale: defeated Tawonga: by 4 goals
  - 1936 - Tawonga: 12.5 - 77 d Yackandandah: 9.13 - 67
- Myrtleford & Bright District Football Association
  - 1940 - Tawonga: 12.15 - 87 d Beechworth Wanderers: 12.12 - 84
- Yackandandah & District Football League
  - 1946 - Kiewa: 4.13 - 37 d Tawonga: 4.9 - 33
  - 1947 - Tawonga: 16.5 - 101 d Kiewa: 5.10 - 40
  - 1950 - Bogong: 8.17 - 64 d Tawonga: 6.4 - 40
  - 1952 - Tawonga: 10.5 - 65 d Bogong: 7.5 - 47 This was Bogong's only loss for the season!
  - 1953 - Bogong: 12.9 - 81 defeated Tawonga: 6.9 - 45

League Best & Fairest

- Myrtleford & Bright District Football Association
  - 1940 - Jim Bishop - Tawonga FC
- Yackandandah & District Football League
  - 1950 - Jim Mooney - Tawonga FC

VFL Players

- 1956 - George Barton
- 1956 - John Cooper

== Bogong Football Club (1947 - 1963) ==
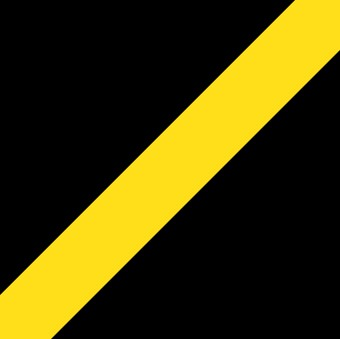
Bogong FC Jumper: 1954 - 59

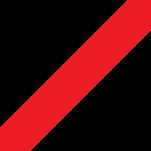
Bogong FC Jumper: 1960 - 63

Timeline

- 1947–1953: Yackandandah & District Football League
- 1954–1959: Ovens & King Football League
- 1960–1963: Tallangatta & District Football League

Football Premierships / Runners Up

- Yackandandah & District Football League
  - 1948 - Kiewa: 9.10 - 64 defeated Bogong: 4.14 - 38
  - 1950 - Bogong: 8.17 - 65 defeated Tawonga: 6.4 - 40
  - 1951 - Bogong: 18.11 - 119 defeated Kiewa: 11.15 - 81
  - 1952 - Tawonga: 10.5 - 65 defeated Bogong: 7.12 - 54
  - 1953 - Bogong: 12.9 - 81 defeated Tawonga: 6.9 - 45
- Ovens & King Football League
  - 1955 - Bogong: 6.12 - 48 d Beechworth: 5.16 - 46 at Tarrawingee
- Tallangatta & District Football League
  - 1962 - Dederang: 5.7 - 37 drew with Bogong: 4.14 - 37 at Tallangatta
  - 1962 - Dederang: 10.13 - 73 d Bogong: 8.10 - 58 (grand final replay) at Tallangatta
  - 1963 - Mitta United: 6.14 - 50 d Bogong: 7.7 - 49 at Sandy Creek

League Best & Fairest

- Yackandandah & District Football League
  - 1947: Jim Bishop - Bogong FC
  - 1948: Jim Bishop - Bogong FC
  - 1952: Ray Braham - Bogong FC
- Tallangatta & District Football League
  - 1960 - Eric Tye - Bogong FC
  - 1962 - George Barton: Bogong FC
  - 1963 - George Barton: Bogong FC

== Bogong - Tawonga Football Club (1964 - 1974) ==
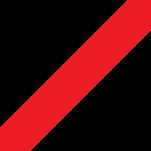
Bogong / Tawonga FC Jumper: 1964-74

The Tawonga F.C. & the Bogong F.C. merged in 1964 and played in the Tallangatta & District Football League.

Football Timeline

- Tallangatta & District Football League
  - 1964 - 1975

Premierships / Runners Up (Grand Finals)

- Tallangatta & District Football League
  - 1965 - Lavington: 8.6 - 54 d Bogong/Tawonga: 6.14 - 50 at Sandy Creek
  - 1966 - Lavington: 9.13 - 67 d Bogong/Tawonga: 9.6 - 60 at Tallangatta

League Best & Fairest

- 1971 - George Barton: Bogong Tawonga FC

== Mt. Beauty Football Club (1975) ==
The Bogong Tawonga Football Club changed their name to Mt. Beauty Football Club in 1975 and played in the Tallangatta & District Football League in 1975, then in 1976, the Dederang FC and the Mt. Beauty FC merged to form the Dederang Mt. Beauty Football Club.

== Dederang - Mount Beauty Football Club (1976 - 2024) ==
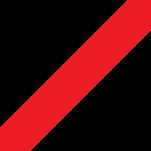
Dederang-Mt Beauty FC Jumper: 1976 - present day

The Bogong-Tawonga F.C. & Dederang F.C. merged in 1976 and formed the Dederang-Mt Beauty Football Club and have played in the Tallangatta & District Football League continuously since 1976.

Timeline

- Tallangatta & District Football League
  - 1976 - 2024

Football Premierships / Runners Up

- Tallangatta & District Football League
  - Seniors
    - 1998 - Tallangatta Valley: 10.16 - 76 d Dederang - Mount Beauty: 4.4 - 28 at Sandy Creek
    - 1999 - Dederang - Mount Beauty: 15.13 - 103 d Kiewa Sandy Creek: 13.9 - 87 at Sandy Creek
    - 2001 - Dederang - Mount Beauty: 17. 9 - 111 d Barnawartha: 12.13 - 85 at Sandy Creek
    - 2003 - Dederang - Mount Beauty: 19.10 - 124 d Mitta United: 9.10 - 64 at Sandy Creek
    - 2005 - Mitta United: 11.15 - 81 d Dederang - Mount Beauty: 6.8 - 44 at Sandy Creek
    - 2008 - Kiewa Sandy Creek: 14.28 - 112 d Dederang - Mount Beauty: 11.12 - 78 at Sandy Creek
- Reserves
  - 1976 - Dederang - Mount Beauty: 8.10 - 58 d Kiewa Sandy Creek: 8.5 - 53
  - 1999 - Dederang - Mount Beauty: 7.6 - 48 d Yackandandah: 6.4 - 40
- Thirds
  - Nil
- Fourths / Under 14's
  - 1998, 1999, 2003; 2013; 2023

League Best & Fairest

- 1990 - Laurie Larsen: Dederang - Mount Beauty FC

Netball Premierships

- No records on the internet of Tallangatta & DFL netball premierships, league best & fairests, etc.

VFL Players

- 1986 - Darren Handley
