= Ian Aston =

Australian rules footballer

Personal information
- Full name: Ian Aston
- Born: 14 October 1937; St Arnaud, Victoria
- Died: 10 November 1988 (aged 51)
- Height: 170 cm (5 ft 7 in)
- Weight: 64 kg (141 lb)
- Position: Rover / Wing

Playing career^{1}
| Years | Club | Games (Goals) |
| 1956–1962 | Fitzroy | 98 (22) |

Representative team honours^{2}
| Years | Team | Games (Goals) |
| 1959 | Victoria | 1 (?) |
- ^{1} Playing statistics correct to the end of 1962.^{2} Representative statistics correct as of 1959.

Ian Aston (14 October 1937 – 10 November 1988) was an Australian rules football player in the Victorian Football League (VFL). He wore the number six guernsey. Known for his speed, Aston played on the ball and also on the wing, playing one interstate match for Victoria in 1959.

He played 98 games and scored 22 goals for Fitzroy from 1956 to 1962, earning eight Brownlow Medal votes in the 1959 season.
