= Mark Hilton (Australian footballer) =

Australian rules footballer

Personal information
- Full name: Mark Hilton
- Born: 27 December 1979 (age 46)
- Original team: North Albury (O&MFL)
- Draft: 1. 48, 2000 Rookie Draft

Playing career^{1}
Years	Club	Games (Goals)
2001	North Melbourne	1 (0)
- ^{1} Playing statistics correct to the end of 2012.

Mark Hilton (born 27 December 1979) is a former Australian rules footballer who played with North Melbourne in the Australian Football League (AFL) in 2001.
