= Peter Curtis (footballer) =

Australian rules footballer (born 1933)

Personal information
- Full name: Peter Jude Curtis
- Born: 13 January 1933
- Died: 12 January 2000 (aged 66)
- Original teams: Coolamon, Griffith, North Albury
- Height: 178 cm (5 ft 10 in)
- Weight: 76 kg (168 lb)

Playing career^{1}
Years	Club	Games (Goals)
1955	North Melbourne	2 (1)
- ^{1} Playing statistics correct to the end of 1955.

Peter Jude Curtis (13 January 1933 – 12 January 2000) was an Australian rules footballer who played with North Melbourne in the Victorian Football League (VFL).

Curtis won the 1951 South West Football League (New South Wales) senior football best and fairest award, the Gammage Medal.

Curtis later transferred to play with Griffith Football Club in 1953, then with North Albury Football Club in the Ovens & Murray Football League in 1954.
