= Kevin Wylie (Australian footballer) =

Australian rules footballer (1933–2023)

Personal information
- Full name: Kevin Wylie
- Born: 17 November 1933
- Died: 6 December 2023 (aged 90)
- Original team: Alphington Amateurs
- Height: 168 cm (5 ft 6 in)
- Weight: 71 kg (157 lb)

Playing career^{1}
Years	Club	Games (Goals)
1954–56	Collingwood	12 (12)
- ^{1} Playing statistics correct to the end of 1956.

Kevin Wylie (17 November 1933 – 6 December 2023) was an Australian rules footballer who played with Collingwood in the Victorian Football League (VFL). He died on 6 December 2023, at the age of 90.
