= Yackandandah & District Football League =

Minor country football league in Australia

- Most recent season or competition: 1953
- Formerly: Yackandandah & District Football Association (1928–1940)
- Sport: Australian rules football
- Founded: 1928; 98 years ago
- First season: 1928
- Folded: 1955; 71 years ago
- No. of teams: 22
- Country: Australia
- Most titles: Bogong FC & Kiewa FC (3)

The Yackandandah & District Football Association was a minor rural Australian rules football competition in North Eastern Victoria. The competition ran from 1928 to 1932, 1940, then from 1946 to 1953, when it folded in early 1954.

== History ==
There was a Yackandandah Football Association established in 1912 amongst the following clubs - Dederang, Yackandandah and Tawonga - with Dederang taking out the premiership.

in 1928, the Yackandandah & District Football Association was formed and Mr. Fred Malcomson, from the Star Hotel, Yackandandah, decided to donate a trophy to the premiers.

In 1933, the Yackandandah & DFA disbanded and the Tallangatta & District Football Association was formed from the following clubs - Bethanga, Granya, Kiewa Valley, Mitta Valley and Tallangatta.

The competition re-formed in 1940 for one year, before going into recess due to World War II. It then re-formed in 1946 and was active up until April 1954 when it went into recess.

In 1947, the Y&DFA had nine local football clubs playing in its competition.

In 1952, Bogong FC changed it club colours to yellow and black.

In 1953, Bogong FC won the minor premiership, with Beechworth Reserves finishing last out of six sides.

All up the Yackandandah & DFA played fifteen season of football, with Bogong FC and Kiewa FC both winning three premierships.

Bogong FC played in five grand finals in their seven years in the Yackandandah & DFA.

In 1954, the competition went into recess. Bogong was admitted into the Ovens & King Football League, but Bright's application was rejected.

In February 1955, the Yackandandah & DFL officially disbanded.

== Clubs ==
=== Final ===
Club	Jumper	Nickname	Home Ground	Former League	Est.	Years in comp	CDFA Senior Premierships		Fate
Club	Jumper	Nickname	Home Ground	Former League	Est.	Years in comp	Total	Years	Fate
Beechworth Reserves		Bombers	Baarmutha Park, Beechworth	MBFL	1861	1952-1953	0	-	Moved to Chiltern & District FA in 1954
Bogong		Tigers	Mount Beauty Recreation Reserve, Mount Beauty	–	1946	1947-1953	3	1950, 1951, 1953	Moved to Ovens & King FL in 1954
Bright		Mountain Men	Pioneer Park, Bright	MBFL	1913	1952-1953	0	-	1954 unknown. Moved to Ovens & King FL in 1955
Dederang			Dederang Recreation Reserve, Dederang	D&DFL	1906	1912, 1940, 1946–1948, 1950–1953	1	1912	Entered recess in 1949 and 1954, re-formed in Tallangatta & District FL in 1955
Tawonga			Tawonga Recreation Reserve, Tawonga	BDFA, MBFL	1927	1929-1930, 1946–1953	2	1947, 1952	Moved to Bright FA in 1931. Moved to Tallangatta & District FL in 1954
Yackandandah		Magpies	Butson Park, Yackandandah	K&DFA, D&DFL	1884	1912, 1928–1932, 1940, 1946–1953	2	1928, 1940	Moved to Chiltern & District FA in 1954

=== Former ===
Club	Jumper	Nickname	Home Ground	Former League	Est.	Years in comp	CDFA Senior Premierships		Fate
Club	Jumper	Nickname	Home Ground	Former League	Est.	Years in comp	Total	Years	Fate
Allans Flat			Allans Flat Recreation Reserve, Allans Flat	K&DFA	1880s	1929-1931	0	-	Folded
Base Workshops			Bandiana Recreation Reserve, Bandiana	C&DFA	1947	1951	0	-	Moved to Tallangatta & District FL in 1952
Bethanga			Bethanga Recreation Reserve, Bethanga	K&DFA	1904	1928-1932	1	1929	Moved to Tallangatta & District FA in 1933
Bullioh		Canaries	Bullioh Recreation Reserve, Tallangatta Valley	–	1928	1928	0	-	Recess in 1929–1930, re-formed in Tallangatta & District FA in 1931
Granya			Bungil Park, Granya	T&DFA	1886	1932	0	-	Returned to Tallangatta & District FA in 1933
Kergunyah		Demons	Kergunyah Recreation Reserve, Kergunyah	AFFA, D&DFL	1923	1928-1932, 1946–1951	1	1930	1933-1935 unknown. Played in Dederang & District FA from 1936. Entered recess in 1952 but re-formed in Tallangatta & District FL in 1953
Kiewa		Rovers	Kiewa Memorial Park, Kiewa	K&DFA, K&MVFL	1895	1929-1932, 1946–1951	3	1946, 1948, 1949	Returned to Tallangatta & District FA in 1933. Moved to Tallangatta & District FL in 1952
Mitta Mitta			Magorra Park, Mitta Mitta	T&DFA	1885	1932	0	-	Returned to Tallangatta & District FA in 1933
Mudgegonga				–		1940, 1946–1948	0	-	Moved to Myrtleford Bright FL in 1949
Sandy Creek			Sandy Creek Recreation Reserve, Sandy Creek	K&DFA, T&DFL	1894	1928-1932, 1947–1949	0	-	Returned to Tallangatta & District FA in 1933. Moved to Tallangatta & District FL in 1950
Stanley			Stanley Recreation Reserve, Stanley	–		1947	0	-	Folded
Talgarno			Talgarno Recreation Reserve, Talgarno	K&DFA	1896	1929-1931	1	1931	Folded
Tallangatta		Magpies	Rowen Park, Tallangatta	T&DFA	1885	1932	0	-	Returned to Tallangatta & District FA in 1933
Tangambalanga			Coulston Park, Tangambalanga	–		1931	0	-	Folded
Wandiligong-Harrietville			Pioneer Park, Bright	MBFL	1879	1952	0	-	Folded after 1952 season

Teams in Association per football season.

- 1912 - 3: Dederang, Tawonga, Yackandandah.
- 1928 - 5: Bethanga, Bullioh, Kergunyah, Sandy Creek, Yackandandah.
- 1929 - 8: Allan's Flats, Bethanga, Kergunyah, Kiewa, Sandy Creek, Talgarno, Tawonga, Yackandandah.
- 1930 - 8: Allan's Flats, Bethanga, Kergunyah, Kiewa, Sandy Creek, Talgarno, Tawonga, Yackandandah.
- 1931 - 8: Allan's Flats, Bethanga, Kergunyah, Kiewa, Sandy Creek, Talgarno, Tangambalanga, Yackandandah.
- 1932 - 7: Bethanga, Kergunyah, Kiewa Rovers, Mitta Mitta, Sandy Creek, Tallangatta, Yackandandah.
- 1940 - 3: Dederang, Mudegonga, Yackandandah.
- 1946 - 6: Dederang, Kergunyah, Kiewa, Mudgegonga, Tawonga, Yackandandah.
- 1947 - 9: Bogong, Dederang, Kergunyah, Kiewa, Mudgegonga, Sandy Creek, Stanley, Tawonga, Yackandandah.
- 1948 - 8: Bogong, Dederang, Kergunyah, Kiewa, Mudgegonga, Sandy Creek, Tawonga, Yackandandah.
- 1949 - 6: Bogong, Kergunyah, Kiewa, Sandy Creek, Tawonga, Yackandandah.
- 1950 - 6: Bogong, Dederang, Kergunyah, Kiewa, Tawonga, Yackandandah.
- 1951 - 7: Base workshops, Bogong, Dederang, Kergunyah, Kiewa, Tawonga, Yackandandah.
- 1952 - 7: Beechworth Reserves, Bogong, Bright, Dederang, Tawonga, Wandiligong, Yackandandah.
- 1953 - 6: Beechworth Reserves, Bogong, Bright, Dederang, Tawonga, Yackandandah

== League Best & Fairest ==
- 1940: J Nutt - Mudegonga FC
- 1941 - 45: Yackandandah & DFA in recess due to World War II.
- 1946:
- 1947: Jim Bishop - Bogong FC
- 1948: Jim Bishop - Bogong FC
- 1949: Albert "Bert" Kemp - Sandy Creek FC
- 1950: Jim Mooney - Tawonga FC
- 1951: R Newton - Kiewa FC
- 1952: Ray Braham - Bogong FC
- 1953: Jim Mooney - Dederang FC

== Football Premierships ==
Grand Final Scores & venues

- 1912 - Dederang:4.7 - 31 d Yackandandah: 1.6 - 12
- 1928 - Yackandandah: 7.16 - 58 defeated Kergunyah: 8.3 - 51 at Sandy Creek.
- 1929 - Bethanga: 5.15 - 45 defeated Yackandandah: 4.7 - 31 at Sandy Creek.
- 1930 - Kergunyah: 11.6 - 72 defeated Bethanga: 6.16 - 52 at Yackandandah Showgrounds.
- 1931 - Bethanga: 8.6 - 54 drew with Talgarno: 8.6 - 54
- 1931 - Talgarno: 11.14 - 80 defeated Bethanga: 10.8 - 68. (Grand final replay). at Kiewa.
- 1932 - Mitta Mitta: 12.9 - 81 defeated Tallangatta: 8.4 - 52 at Sandy Creek.
- 1933 - Yackandandah & DFA disbanded in April 1933, reformed in 1940.
- 1940 - Yackandandah: 13.12 - 90 defeated Mudgegonga: 5.9 - 39 at Mudgegonga
- 1941 - 1945: Yackandandah & DFA in recess due to World War II
- 1946 - Kiewa: 4.13 - 37 defeated Tawonga: 4.9 - 33
- 1947 - Tawonga: 16.5 - 101 defeated Kiewa: 5.10 - 40
- 1948 - Kiewa: 9.10 - 64 defeated Bogong: 4.14 - 38
- 1949 - Kiewa: 7.8 - 50 defeated Yackandandah: 5.9 - 39
- 1950 - Bogong: 8.17 - 65 defeated Tawonga: 6.4 - 40 at Yackandandah.
- 1951 - Bogong: 18.11 - 119 defeated Kiewa: 11.15 - 81
- 1952 - Tawonga: 10.5 - 65 defeated Bogong: 7.12 - 54 at Yackandandah. This was Bogong's only loss for the season.
- 1953 - Bogong: 12.9 - 81 defeated Tawonga: 6.9 - 45 at Yackandandah.
- 1954 - The Yackandandah & DFL went into recess in April 1954.
- 1955 - The Yackandandah & DFL officially disbands in February 1955.

== Most Premierships / Runners Up ==
Club	Most Premierships	Runners up	Draw	Grand Finals
Bogong	3	2		5
Kiewa	3	2		5
Tawonga	2	3		5
Yackandandah	2	3		5
Bethanga	1	2	1	4
Talgarno	1		1	2
Kergunyah	1	1		2
Mitta Mitta	1			1
Dederang	1			1
Mudgegonga		1		1
Tallangatta		1		1
Total	15	15	2	32

== Office Bearers ==
Year	President	Secretary	Treasurer
1928			
1929	Reg G. Evans	Edgar Hadley	
1930	Reg G. Evans	G Wynack	G Wynack
1931	Reg G. Evans	F Grant	L Matthews
1932	E Butson		
1933-39	Y&DFA in	recess	
1940			
1941-45	Y&DFA in	recess. World War II	
1946			
1947	G Kelly		
1948	G Kelly		
1949	G Kelly		
1950	G Kelly		
1951	G Kelly	E Butson	E Butson
1952	G Kelly	E Butson	
1953	T Agnew	E Butson	E Butson
1954			
1955		E Butson	

== Links ==
- Tallangatta & District Football League
- Chiltern & District Football Association
- List of former Australian rules football competitions in Victoria
- 1946 - Rode eight miles to watch football match
- 1946 - Kiewa FC team photo
- 1946 - Yackandandah & DFL Preliminary Final: Yackandandah FC team photo
- 1947 - Yackandandah FC team photo
- 1948 - Yackandandah & DFL Premiers: Kiewa FC team photo
- 1948 - Yackandandah & DFL Runners Up: Bogong FC team photo
- 1949 - Bogong FC team photo
- 1949 - Sandy Creek FC team photo
- 1949 - Yackandandah & DFL Premiers: Kiewa FC team photo
- 1950 - Kiewa FC team photo
- 1950 - Yackandandah & DFL Premiers: Bogong FC team photo
- 1950 - Yackandandah & DFL Runners Up: Tawonga FC team photo
- 1950 - Yackandandah & DFL Best & Fairest Winner: Jim Mooney: Tawonga FC
- 1951 - Bogong FC team photo: April, 1951
- 1951 - Yackandandah & DFL Premiers: Bogong FC team photo
- 1951 - Yackandandah & DFL Runners Up: Kiewa FC team photo
- 1951 - Albert Kemp photo: Sandy Creek FC
- 1953 - Yackandandah & DFL Premiers & Runners Up: Bogong FC & Tawonga FC team photos
- 1953 - Yackandandah & DFL Best & Fairest Winner: Jim Mooney: Dederang FC
