= Ferndale, New South Wales =

Ferndale New South Wales
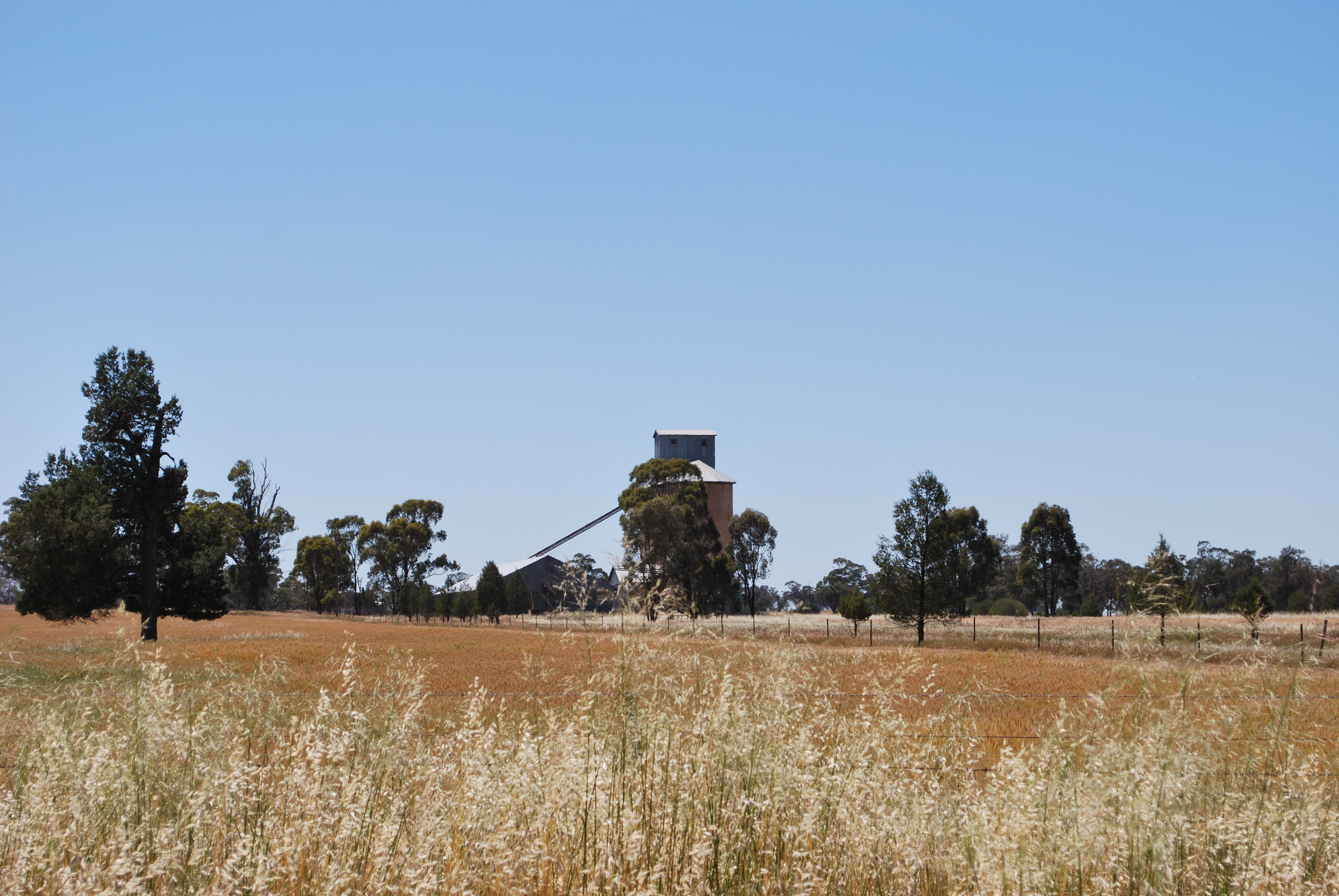
- Silos

- Coordinates: 35°33′0″S 146°37′0″E
- Elevation: 151 m (495 ft)
- Location: 6 km (4 mi) from Rand; 8 km (5 mi) from Urangeline East
- County: Hume
- State electorate(s): Albury

Ferndale is a community in the central part of the Riverina, New South Wales, Australia. It is situated about 6 kilometres north east from Rand and 8 kilometres south west from Urangeline East.

It was serviced by the Rand branch railway line before the line was closed in 1975.

Ironbong Post Office opened on 16 July 1885, was renamed Ferndale in 1898, and closed in 1920.
