= Ryan, New South Wales =

Ryan
- Town
- Coordinates: 35°32′S 146°53′E
- Country: Australia
- State: New South Wales
- LGA: Lockhart Shire
- Location: 19 km (12 mi) from Henty; 30 km (19 mi) from Walbundrie

Government
  - State electorate: Wagga Wagga
  - Federal division: Riverina
- Elevation: 149 m (489 ft)

Population
  - Total: 62 (SAL 2021)
- Postcode: 2658
- County: Urana

Ryan is a village community in the central south part of the Riverina, in the Australian state of New South Wales. It is situated by road, about 19 kilometres south-west from Henty and 30 kilometres north-east from Walbundrie.

The town was serviced by the Rand branch railway line before the line was closed in 1975. A Small school (closed) and tennis club are still located on site. Notable figure of the area was Ryan William Thomas,
