= Bulgandry =

- Town
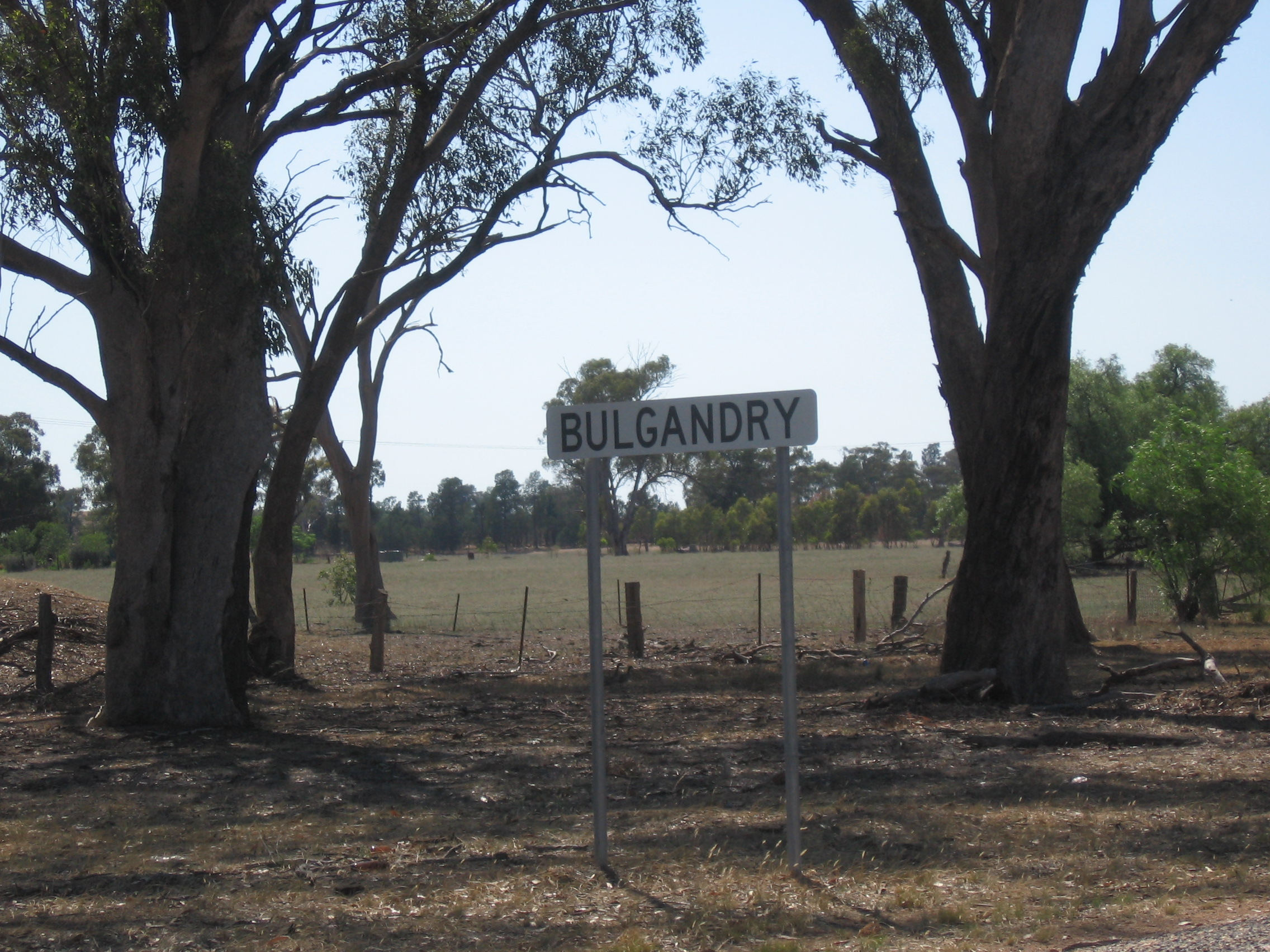
- Entry sign

- Coordinates: 35°37′S 146°37′E
- Country: Australia
- State: New South Wales
- LGA: Greater Hume Shire Council
- Location: 551 km (342 mi) from Sydney; 73 km (45 mi) from Albury; 12 km (7.5 mi) from Walbundrie; 6 km (3.7 mi) from Rand; 12 km (7.5 mi) from Walbundrie

Government
  - State electorate: Albury
- Elevation: 159 m (522 ft)
- Postcode: 2642
- County: Hume

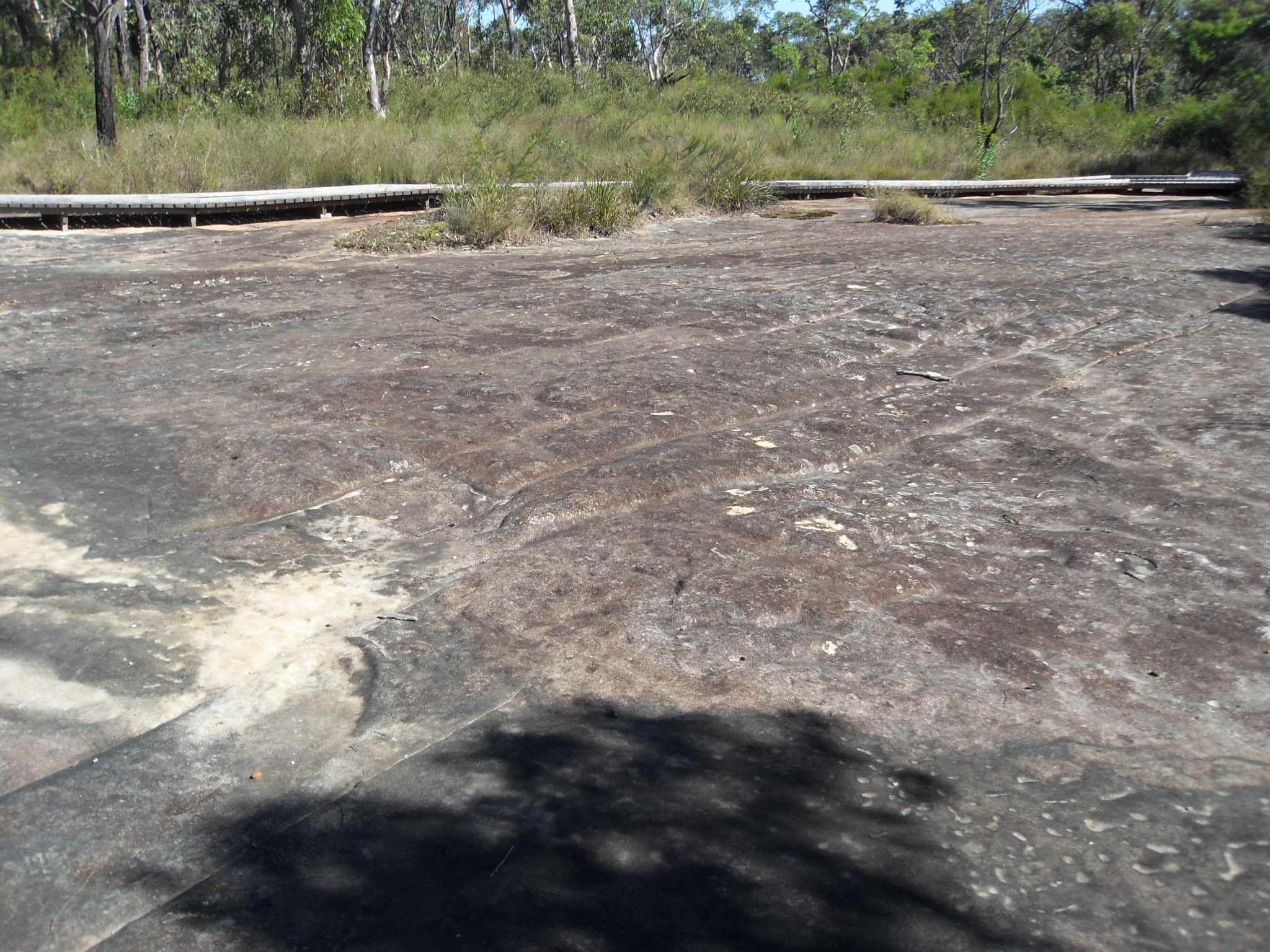
Bulgandry aboriginal site

Bulgandry is a village community in the central part of the Riverina. By road it is about 6 kilometres southeast of Rand and 12 kilometres north west of Walbundrie.

== History ==
The place name Bulgandry is derived from the local Aboriginal word meaning "boomerang in hand".

Walbundrie Reefs Post Office opened on 1 July 1875, was renamed Bulgandry in 1900 and closed in 1975.

The Walbundrie Football Association Australian rules football competition existed for one season only, 1914, consisting of the following clubs – Bulgandra, Burrumbuttock, Walbundrie and Walla. Bulgandra: 5.4 – 34 defeated Walla: 4.8 – 32 in the grand final.

A fatal shooting occurred in Bulgandry on Saturday 8 February 1919. Bulgandra Hotel licensee Mrs. Mary Josephine Devlin, was shot in the right arm with a shotgun at 11 pm by a man at the hotel, shattering her arm. She was brought to Albury early on Sunday morning and her arm was amputated; she died at 1 pm. She was shot by Patrick Lawrence Gleeson, who had been living at the hotel and had developed a relationship with her. Gleeson was tried and sentenced to 15 years in Goulburn Gaol.
