= Redlands, New South Wales =

Redlands New South Wales
- Coordinates: 35°55′54″S 146°19′4″E
- Population: 36 (2016 census)
- Postcode(s): 2646
- LGA(s): Federation Council
- County: Hume
- State electorate(s): Albury
- Federal division(s): Division of Farrer

Redlands is a locality in the Riverina region of New South Wales, Australia.
