= Ferndale =

Ferndale is the name of several places:

== In Canada ==
- Ferndale, British Columbia
- Ferndale, Bruce County, Ontario
- Ferndale, Muskoka District Municipality, Ontario
- Ferndale, Peel Regional Municipality, Ontario

== In the United States ==
- Ferndale, California
- Ferndale, Florida
- Ferndale, Indiana
- Ferndale, Kentucky
- Ferndale, Maryland
  - Ferndale (Baltimore Light Rail station), Baltimore, Maryland
- Ferndale, Michigan
- Ferndale, New York
- Ferndale, Oregon
- Ferndale, Pennsylvania
- Ferndale, Washington

== In Australia ==
- Ferndale, Western Australia
- Ferndale, New South Wales
- Ferndale, Victoria (small rural locality in Strezlecki Ranges south of Warragul)
- Ferndale Park, New South Wales

== In New Zealand ==
- Ferndale House, a historic home in Mount Albert, Auckland
- Ferndale, Taranaki, a suburb of New Plymouth
- A fictitious West Auckland suburb in which the TVNZ soap opera Shortland Street takes place

== In other countries ==
- Ferndale (Lambeth ward), an electoral ward in Brixton and Clapham, London, England
- Ferndale, Rhondda Cynon Taf, Wales, United Kingdom
- Ferndale, Western Cape, Brackenfell, South Africa
- Ferndale, South Africa, Randburg, South Africa

== See also ==
- Fairview-Ferndale, Pennsylvania
