= Eastern Riverina Chronicle =

Former newspaper in New South Wales

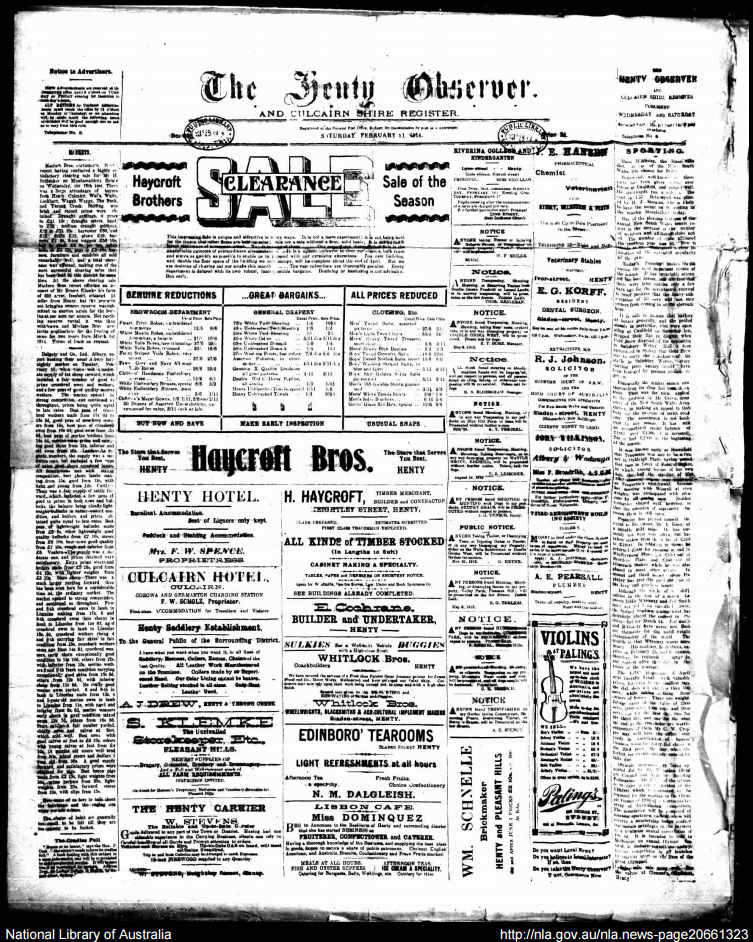
Front page of The Observer on 21 February 1914.

The Eastern Riverina Chronicle, previously published as The Observer, The Henty Observer and Culcairn Shire Register and Shire's Observer, the Eastern Riverina Observer and the Holbrook, Billabong & Upper Murray Chronicle, is a newspaper published in Henty, New South Wales, Australia.

== History ==
The Observer was first published in 1906 using equipment bought from The Border Post, and Wodonga Advertiser, an Albury newspaper which had ceased operation in 1902. It was also titled The Henty observer and Culcairn Shire register and Shire's observer. The press moved a number of times in Henty until, after a fire destroyed its premises in 1933, a new building was constructed. The paper continued to be based from this building until 2008, when it was converted to a museum. In 1981 it changed name to the Eastern Riverina Observer and remained in publication under this title until 2003.

In 2003, the Observer merged with the Holbrook, Billabong & Upper Murray Chronicle (which had been in publication since 1989) to form the Eastern Riverina Chronicle.

== Digitisation ==
The paper has been digitised as part of the Australian Newspapers Digitisation Program project of the National Library of Australia.

== See also ==
- List of newspapers in Australia
- List of newspapers in New South Wales
