= Collendina, New South Wales =

Collendina New South Wales
- Coordinates: 35°59′54″S 146°9′4″E
- Population: 107 (2016 census)
- Postcode(s): 2646
- Location: 627.5 km (390 mi) SW of Sydney; 301.3 km (187 mi) N of Melbourne; 74.4 km (46 mi) NW of Albury; 19.3 km (12 mi) N of Corowa
- LGA(s): Federation Council
- County: Hume
- State electorate(s): Albury
- Federal division(s): Division of Farrer

Collendina is a locality in the Riverina region of New South Wales, Australia. The locality is about 627.5 kilometres (389.9 mi) south west of the state capital, Sydney and 301.3 kilometres (187.2 mi) north of Melbourne.
