= Yerong Creek =

- Town
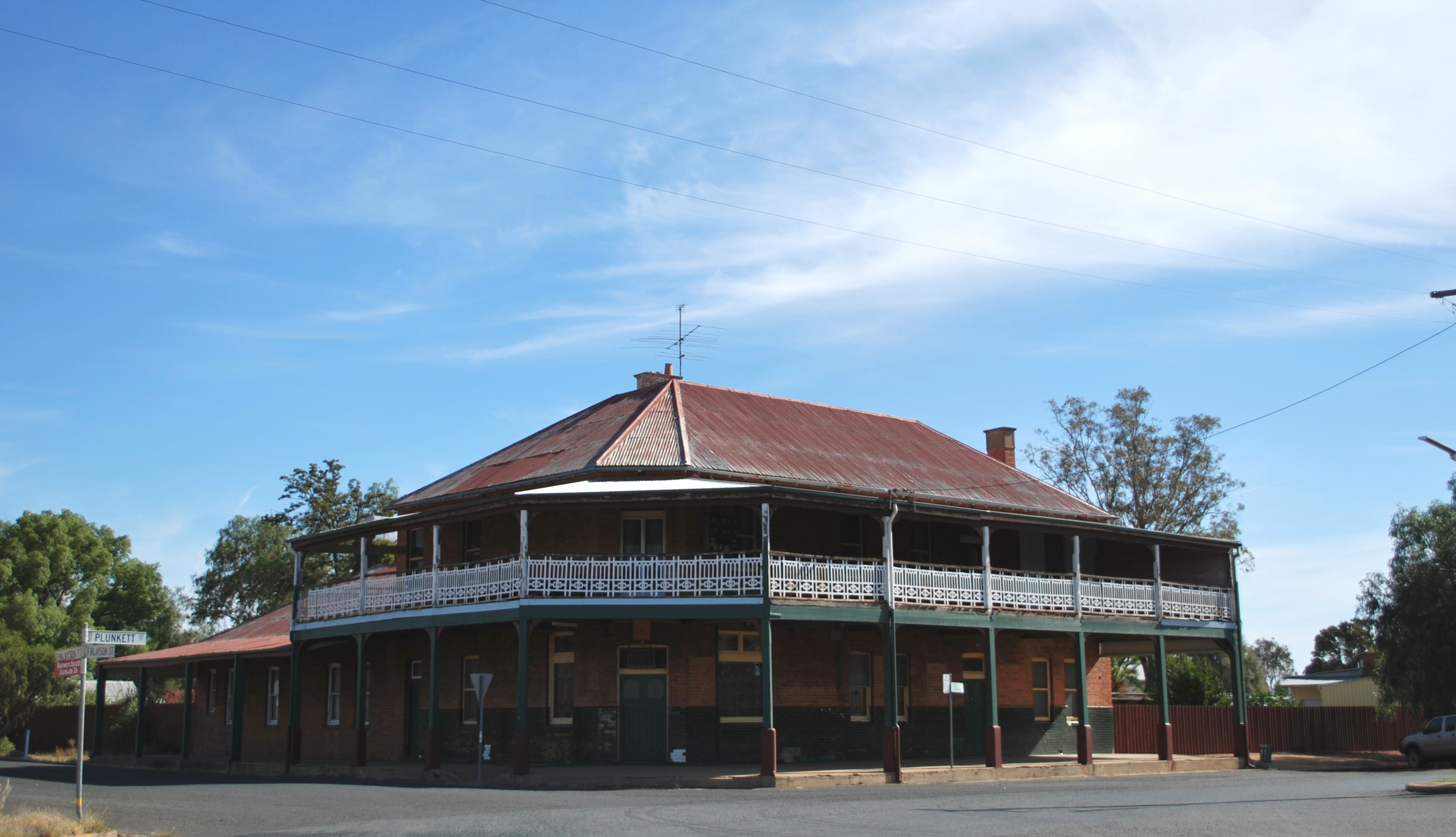
- Former hotel at Yerong Creek

- Coordinates: 35°23′0″S 147°04′0″E
- Country: Australia
- State: New South Wales
- LGA: Lockhart Shire
- Location: 502 km (312 mi) SW of Sydney; 46 km (29 mi) S of Wagga Wagga; 15 km (9.3 mi) S of The Rock

Government
  - State electorate: Wagga Wagga
  - Federal division: Riverina

Population
  - Total: 173 (2016 census)
- Postcode: 2642
- County: Mitchell

Yerong Creek is a town in the Riverina area of southern New South Wales, Australia. It is about 46 kilometres (29 mi) south-west of Wagga Wagga on the Olympic Highway. At the 2016 census, Yerong Creek had a population of 173.

Yerong Creek station is serviced twice daily by NSW TrainLink XPT trains which travel along the Main Southern Railway line between Sydney and Melbourne (there is no stop listed in timetables for Yerong Creek; the nearest stations are The Rock to the north and Henty to the south). The town is home to a small population and was the original home of the vintage rally.

Yerong Creek Post Office opened on 1 October 1882.

Whilst Yerong Creek is predominantly a mixed farming and grazing area, it holds a claim in Australian history when in 1993 the XPT established the Australian Rail Speed Record of 193 kilometres per hour (120 mph) between a nearby area known as Table Top and the township

Yerong Creek was also home to the vintage rally, though this event is no longer held.

== Gallery ==
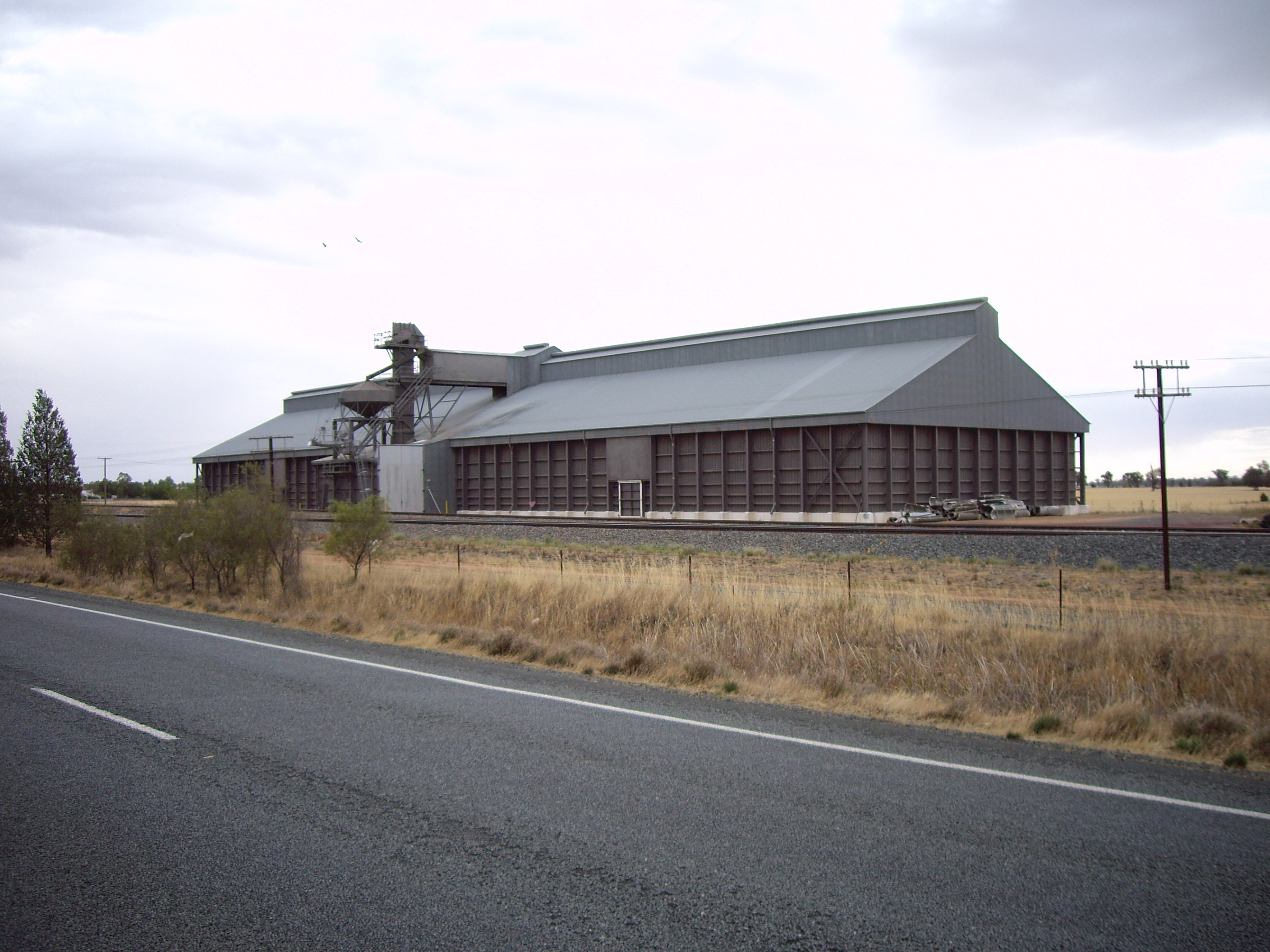
Silo at edge of township (on railway line)

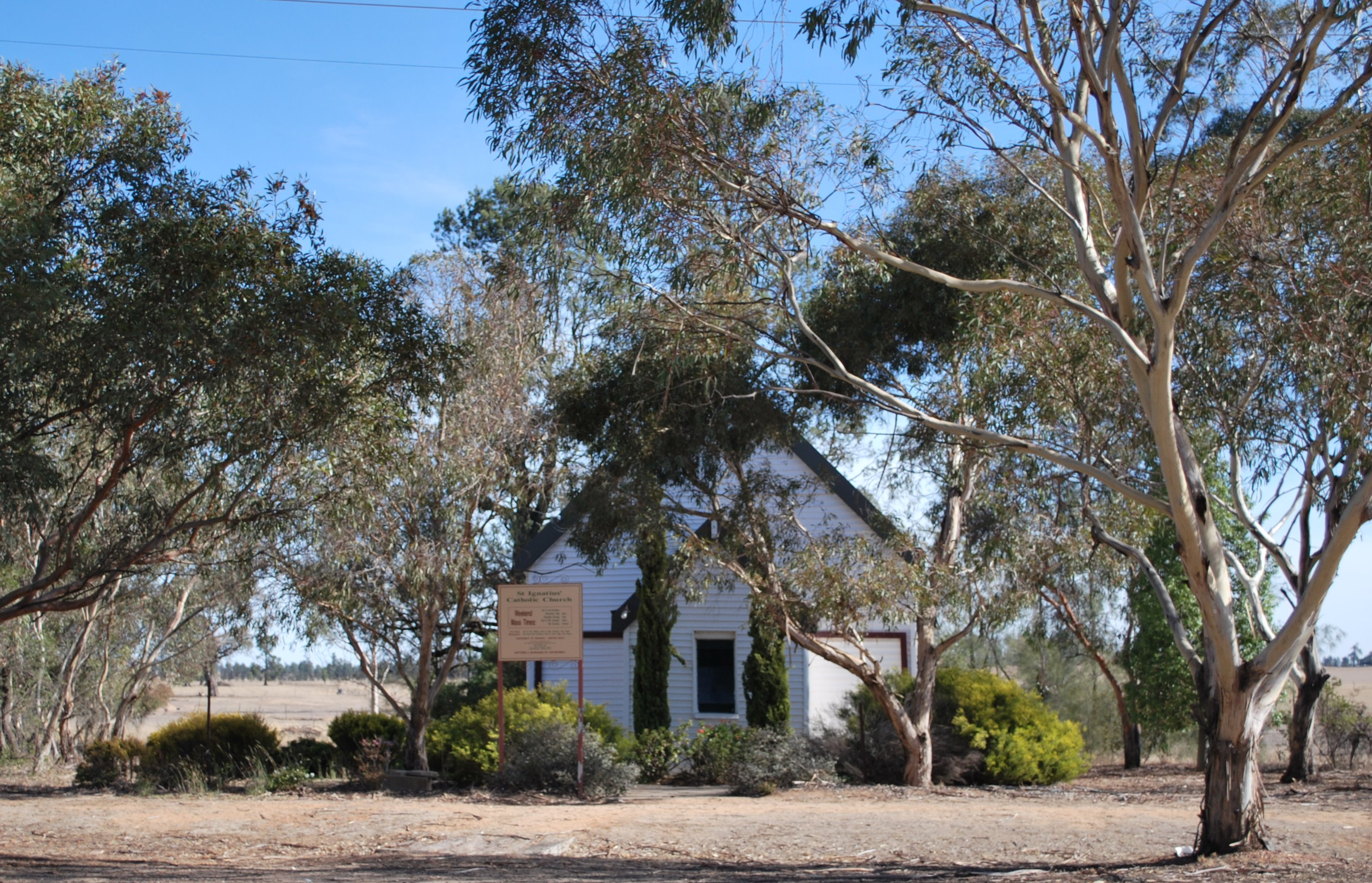
St Ignatius Roman Catholic church

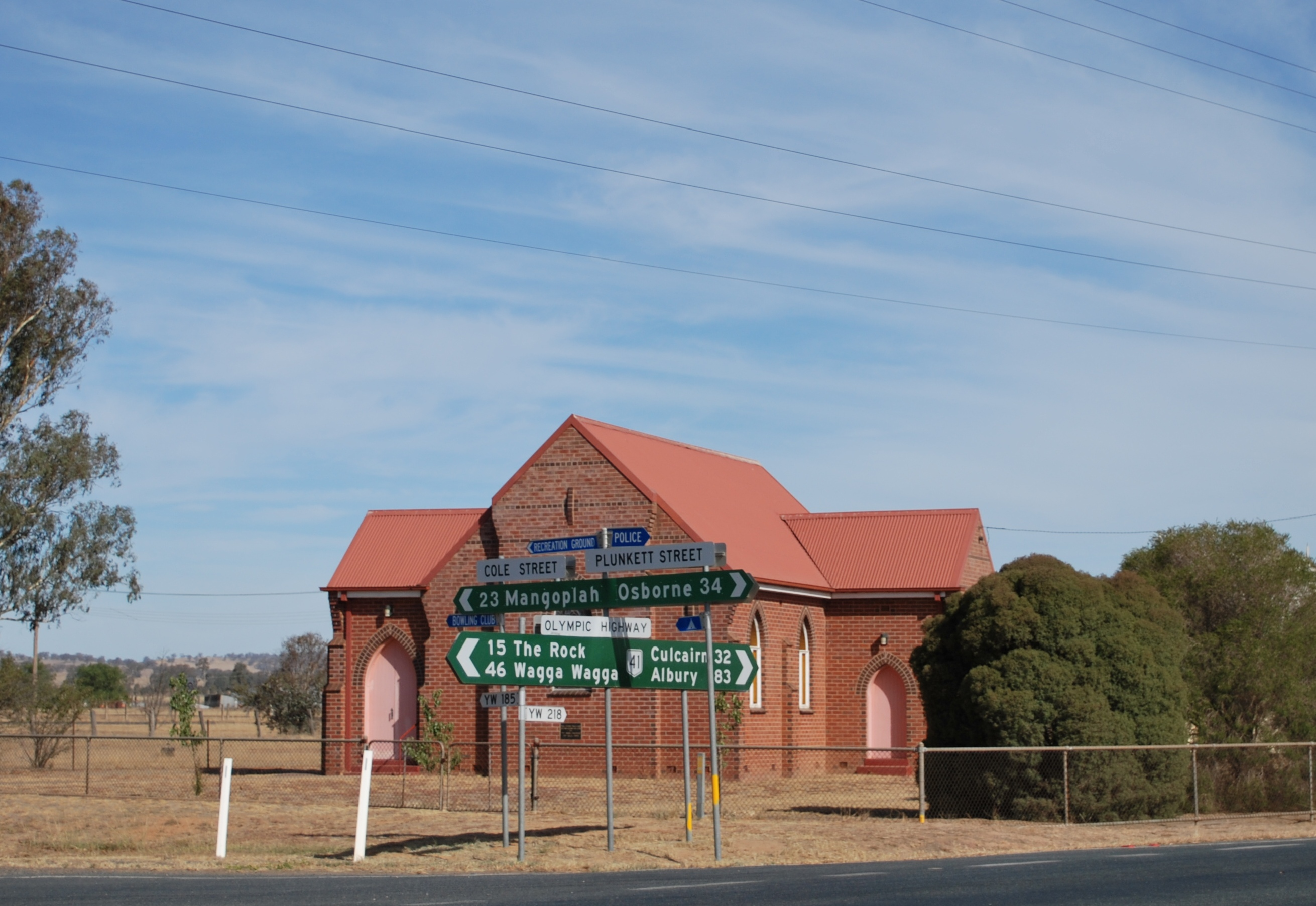
Church
