= Yerong Creek railway station =

Former railway station in New South Wales, Australia

Yerong Creek

General information
- Location: Yerong Creek, New South Wales; Australia
- Coordinates: 35°23′10″S 147°03′36″E
- Elevation: 215 metres (705 ft)
- Operator: State Rail Authority
- Line: Main Southern line
- Distance: 565.090 km (351.131 mi) from Central
- Platforms: 1 (1 side)
- Tracks: 3

Construction
- Structure type: Ground

History
- Opened: 1 September 1880
- Closed: c.1984

Services
| Preceding station | Former services | Following station |
|---|---|---|
| Henty towards Albury | Main Southern Line | The Rock towards Sydney |
Location

Yerong Creek railway station was a railway station on the Main Southern line, serving the town of Yerong Creek in the Riverina, New South Wales, Australia. It served passengers between 1880 and the 1980s.

== History ==
The station opened in 1880 and was closed c.1984. The platform buildings were demolished in the 1980s, and only a low platform remains at the site.

In 2011, a train passed the signal at Yerong Creek without authority, an incident known as a signal passed at danger.

== Description ==
Yerong Creek station consisted of a single side platform with a weatherboard station building and signal box. It was opened with a crossing loop of about 400m length. In 2010, the crossing loop was extended into a 7 km passing loop, with intermediate home signals protecting a level crossing and wheat sidings which have the effect of allowing the passing loop to hold two trains in one direction.
