= Vin Bourke =

Australian rules footballer

Personal information
- Full name: Vincent Valera Bourke
- Born: 14 September 1933; Henty, New South Wales
- Died: 19 November 2009 (aged 76)
- Original teams: Henty, North Albury
- Height: 173 cm (5 ft 8 in)
- Weight: 64 kg (141 lb)

Playing career^{1}
Years	Club	Games (Goals)
1957	North Melbourne	1 (0)
- ^{1} Playing statistics correct to the end of 1957.

Vincent Valera Bourke (14 September 1933 – 19 November 2009) was an Australian rules footballer who played with North Melbourne in the Victorian Football League (VFL).

Bourke, originally from Henty, was signed by North Melbourne in 1954.
