= Rand railway line =

Former railway line in New South Wales

The Rand railway line is a closed railway line in New South Wales, Australia. The line ran for 53 km south-west to the town of Rand from the Main South railway line at Henty.

== Proposals ==
In 1908, a petition was handed to the Minister for Public Works requesting the construction of a railway from Yerong Creek to Daysdale, via Pleasant Hills. By October that year, a survey had been conducted and it was recommended that a line from Henty was preferable.

A further deputation was made to the Minister on 10 November 1910 and he suggested that an unballasted line could be acceptable to Government. Eleven months later, on 25 October 1911, the Minister for Public Works recommended that the line be referred to the Parliamentary Standing Committee on Public Works. The enquiry opened on 16 November.

Following many hearings at locations throughout the area, the Committee returned to Sydney and passed the resolution that the line be built from Henty towards Daysdale, but be carried out to Billabong Creek, the site of the future township of Rand. On 29 November 1916 the requisite Act was signed by the Governor.

== Construction ==
The Public Works Department commenced construction in March, 1918. The rails for the line were being rolled at Newcastle, but supply was short and delays ensued. By May 1919, the line had reached Pleasant Hills and goods were carried over the line. Twelve months later the line reached Rand.

In 1918 there was a proposal to extend the line from Rand to Ringwood. The matter was investigated by the Parliamentary Standing Committee of Public Works, but it was rejected in 1922.

== Opening ==
The line was available for traffic from 17 May 1920. It was an unfenced, "Pioneer" line. Stations were established at Ryan, Munyabla, Pleasant Hills, Urangeline, Ferndale and Rand. All intermediate stations were unattended.

The Official Opening took place on 16 October 1920. There was a ribbon cutting ceremony at Rand and a banquet in the Pleasant Hills Literary Institute.

== Train Working ==
=== Passenger and mixed trains ===
At the commencement, the service on the line was a Mixed Train (comprising goods vehicles and a passenger carriage) on Mondays, Wednesdays and Fridays. This was probably hauled by a Z12-class locomotive. It made the return journey the following day. From January 1922, the train returned to Henty on the same day as the outward journey.

Railmotors began to operate on the line from December, 1923, but they only lasted until November 1924, when the Mixed train returned as the passenger service. In 1930 the service was reduced to running on Mondays and Fridays. The service remained as a twice weekly service thereafter, until April 1942 when a railmotor service was timetabled on Wednesdays and Saturdays. It went a Saturdays only service from 10 March 1946. This remained in force until 21 January 1956 when passenger services were suspended.

=== Junctions ===
The junctions on the line that were not even proper towns but just farming areas (these places are Ryan and Munyabla) only consisted of a minor station and a loading bank. Though in Urangeline and Ferndale there was a stock race included. At Rand there was a station, water stand where the steam trains filled up with water, a coal stage where the trains filled up with coal, a loading bank and a station. At Pleasant Hills there was a station, a water stand, a loading bank and a stock race. In 1933 two silos were added. Loading banks were used for loading and unloading mail, cargo etc.

=== Goods trains ===
During the 1920s, goods trains would have been hauled by Z25-class locomotive. In the 1930s, 30T and 50 class locomotives would have been rostered. Locomotives and their crews were based at Culcairn. Goods trains appear to have worked mostly on Tuesdays.

Diesels arrived in late 1961 for trials on a number of Southern branches and the following January, they were permanently allocated.

From 14 February 1972 the Rand line saw its weekly goods train on Thursday nights.

== Closure ==
The last goods train worked to Rand and return on 17 June 1987.
