= Henty railway station =

Railway station in New South Wales, Australia

Henty
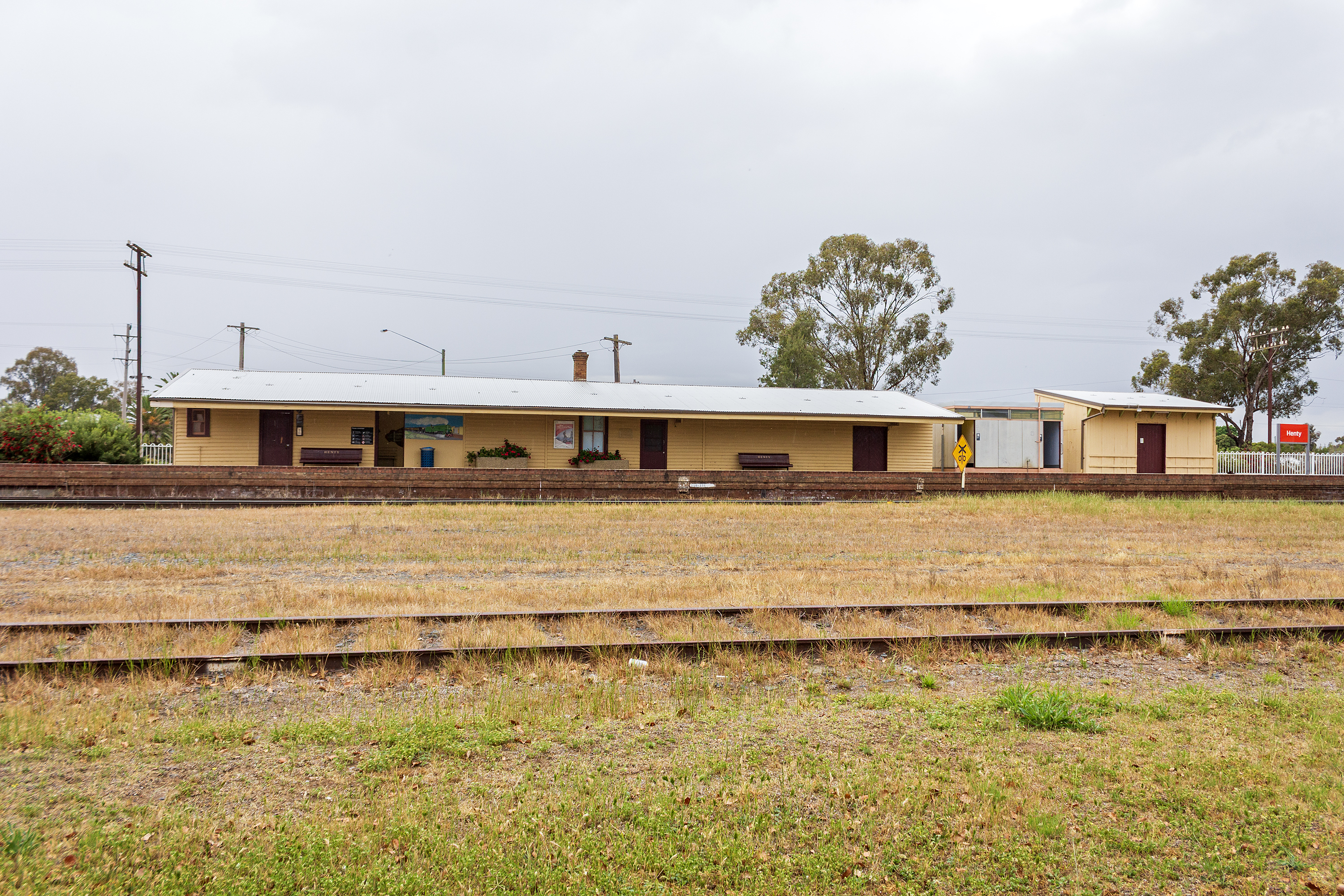
- station viewed from Ivor Street

General information
- Location: Olympic Highway, Henty; Australia
- Coordinates: 35°31′04″S 147°02′07″E
- Owner: Transport Asset Manager of New South Wales
- Operator: NSW TrainLink
- Line: Main Southern
- Distance: 580.29 kilometres (360.58 mi) from Central
- Platforms: 1
- Tracks: 2

Construction
- Structure type: Ground

Other information
- Station code: HTY

History
- Opened: 1880; 146 years ago
- Rebuilt: 1904; 122 years ago
- Former names: Doodle Cooma (1880–1891)

Services
Preceding station	NSW TrainLink	Following station
Culcairn towards Melbourne	NSW TrainLink Southern Line Melbourne XPT	The Rock towards Sydney
Former services
Preceding station	Former services	Following station
Former NSW Main line services
Culcairn towards Albury	Main Southern Line	Yerong Creek towards Sydney
Location

Henty railway station is a heritage-listed railway station located on the Main Southern line in New South Wales, Australia. It serves the town of Henty. It was added to the New South Wales State Heritage Register on 2 April 1999.

== History ==
Henty station opened in 1880 as Doodle Cooma. It was renamed Henty on 4 February 1891, and relocated to its present site in 1904. Opposite the platform lies a passing loop.

== Services ==
Henty is served by two daily NSW TrainLink XPT services in each direction operating between Sydney and Melbourne. This is a request stop, so the train stops only if passengers booked to board/alight here.

Platform	Line	Stopping pattern	Notes
1	Southern Region	services to Sydney Central & Melbourne	request stop (booked passengers only)

== Gallery ==
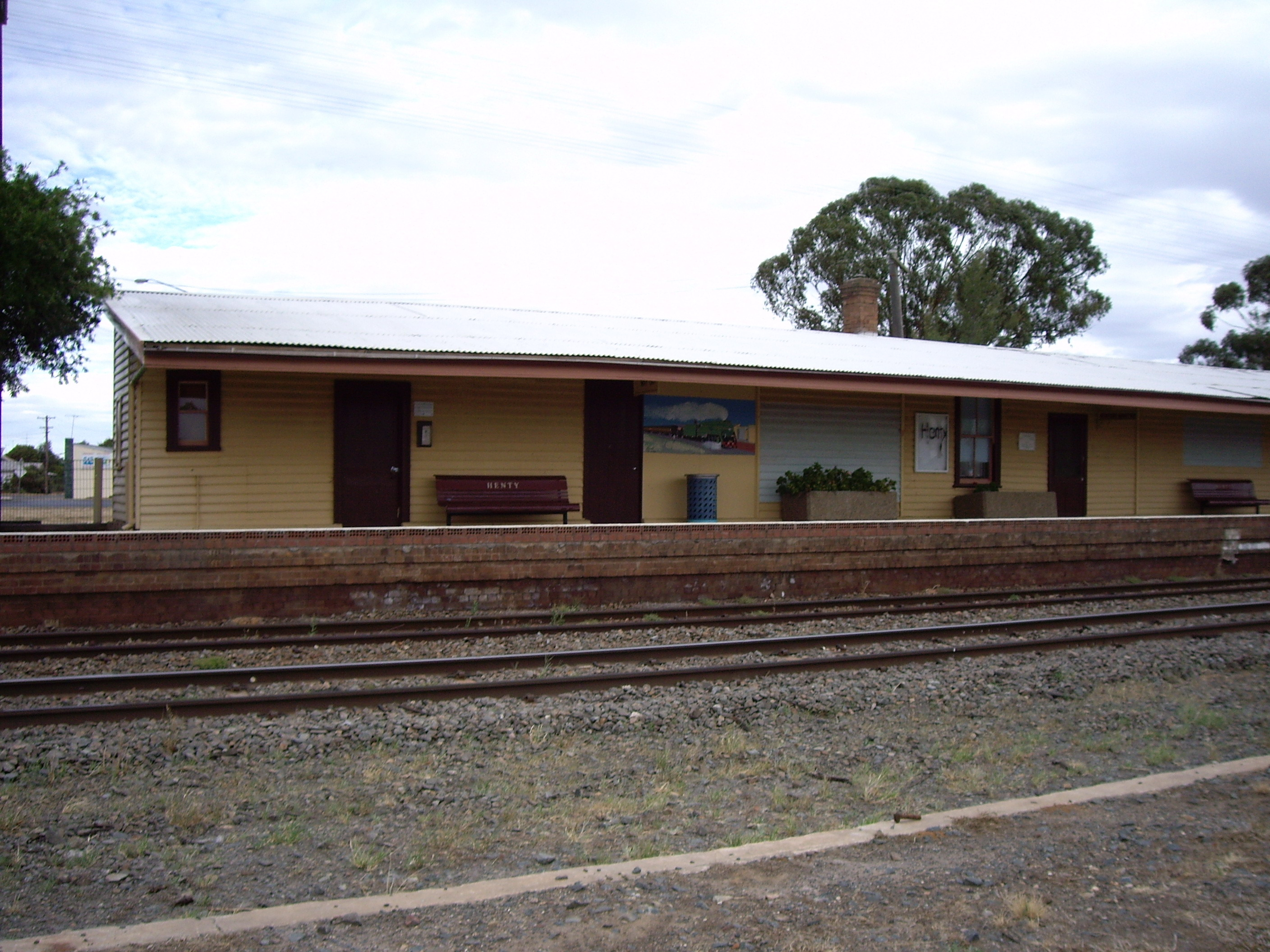
Station building and platform, December 2007

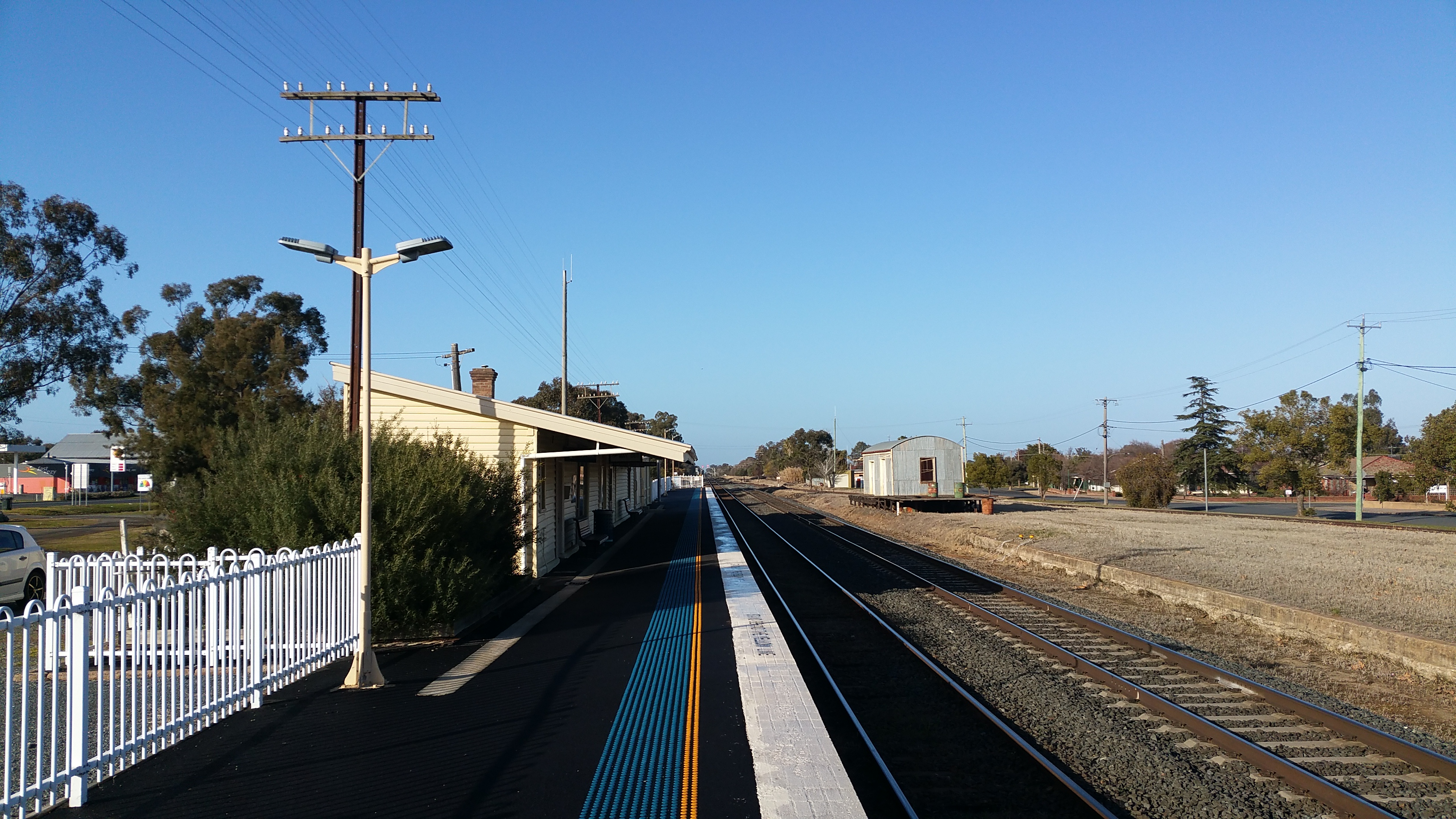
View from along the platform, July 2018

== Description ==
The heritage-listed station complex includes the main station building, which is a timber building of type 7 design with a skillion roof completed in 1904, the brick platform dating from c. 1880, and the goods shed, built from corrugated iron with dimensions of 45'x17' and a curved semi-elliptical roof.

== Heritage listing ==
This site contains a range of items not often found together, comprising a simple skillion roof timber station building with a rare curved roof goods shed, one of the few remaining and an early gatehouse of which several are found on that section of line. Individually the goods shed is of high significance and together they form an important group of buildings. They are also prominent in the centre of the small town of Henty on the main street.

Henty railway station was listed on the New South Wales State Heritage Register on 2 April 1999 having satisfied the following criteria.

The place possesses uncommon, rare or endangered aspects of the cultural or natural history of New South Wales.

This item is assessed as historically rare. This item is assessed as arch. rare. This item is assessed as socially rare.
