= Walbundrie =

- Town
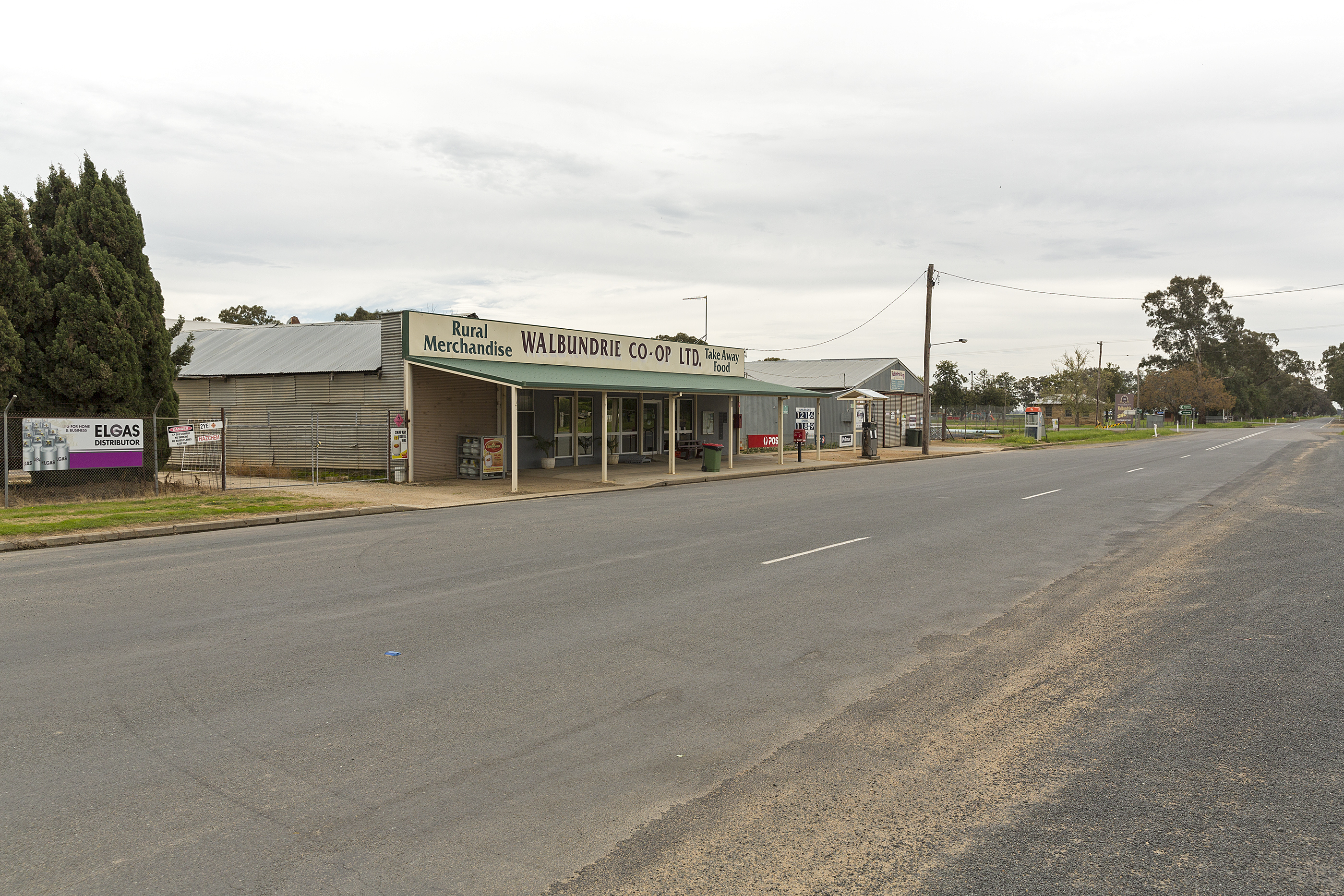
- Walbundrie, looking north up Billabong St. The intersection shown leads to the neighbouring town of Rand.

- Coordinates: 35°41′0″S 146°43′0″E
- Country: Australia
- State: New South Wales
- LGA: Greater Hume Shire Council
- Location: 546 km (339 mi) SW of Sydney; 335 km (208 mi) NE of Melbourne; 50 km (31 mi) NW of Albury; 32 km (20 mi) W of Culcairn

Government
  - State electorate: Albury
  - Federal division: Farrer
- Elevation: 151 m (495 ft)

Population
  - Total: 156 (2021 census)
- Postcode: 2642
- County: Hume

Walbundrie /wɒlˈbʌndri/ is a village in the eastern Riverina district of New South Wales, Australia. The village is located 546 kilometres (339 mi) south-west of the state capital, Sydney and 335 kilometres (208 mi) north of Melbourne. Situated on the bank of the Billabong Creek, at the 2021 census, Walbundrie had a population of 156. Walbundrie is in the Greater Hume Shire local government area. Billabong Creek passes immediately south of the town.

Piney Range Post Office opened on 1 March 1869 and was renamed Walbundrie later that month.

The major industry in and around Walbundrie is agriculture, including grain production and wool growing.

== Sport and recreation ==
The first published details of an Australian rules football club in Walbundrie was in 1906 when they played a match against Corowa Football Club in Corowa.

As of 2022 Australian rules football and netball are the most popular sport in Walbundrie and the club plays in the Hume Football League, fielding four football teams and five netball under the merged club's name of Rand - Walbundrie Walla Giants Football and Netball Club. The Rand Walbundrie Walla Giants FNC is a Sports Club formed after the amalgamation between the Rand Walbundrie Tigers & the Walla Hoppers in 2016.

Walbundrie Football Association.

This Australian rules football competition existed for one season only and in 1914 it consisted of the following clubs - Bulgandra, Burrumbuttock, Walbundrie and Walla. Bulgandra: 5.4 – 34 defeated Walla: 4.8 – 32 in the grand final.

== Gallery ==
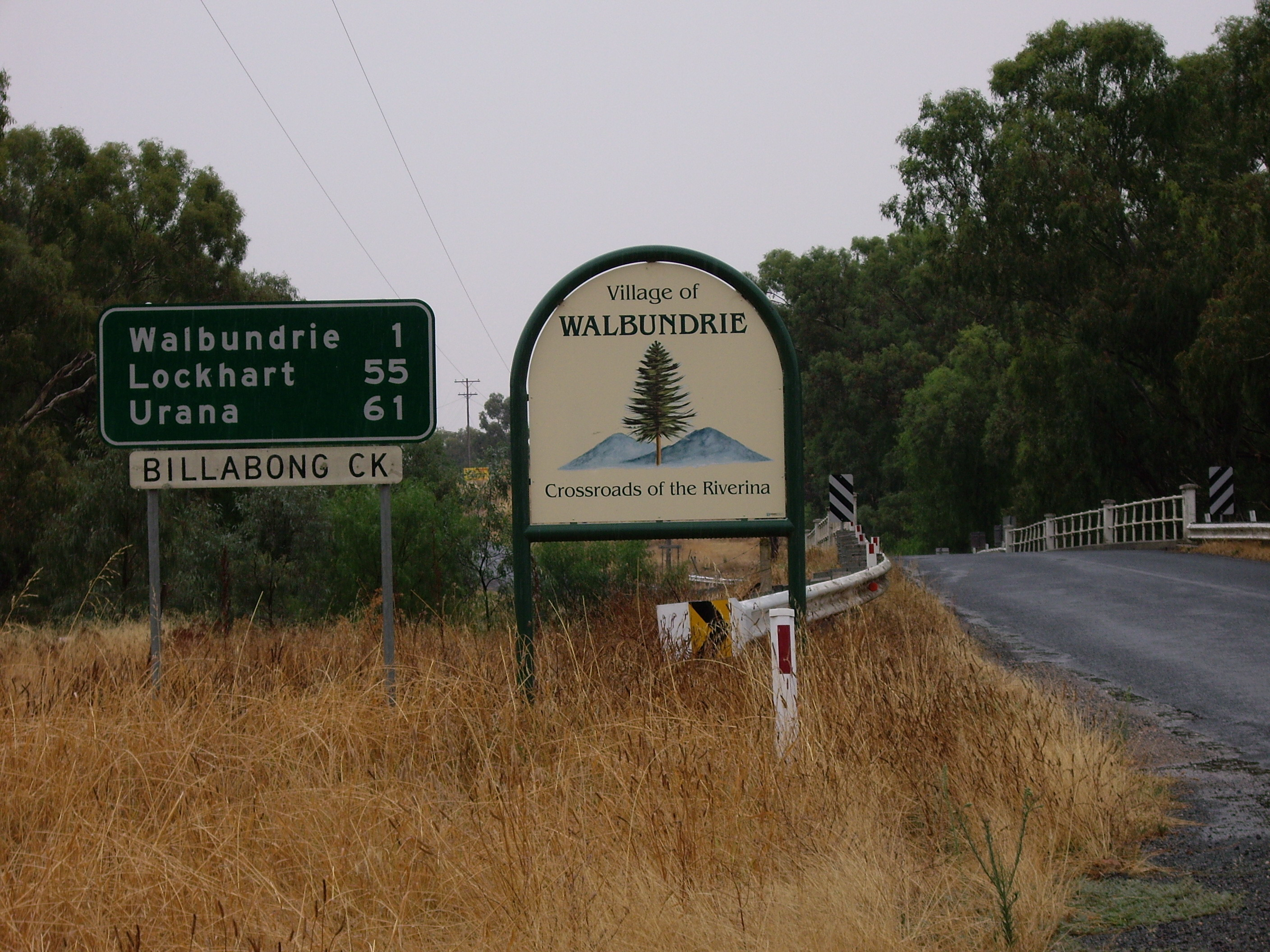
Entering Walbundrie

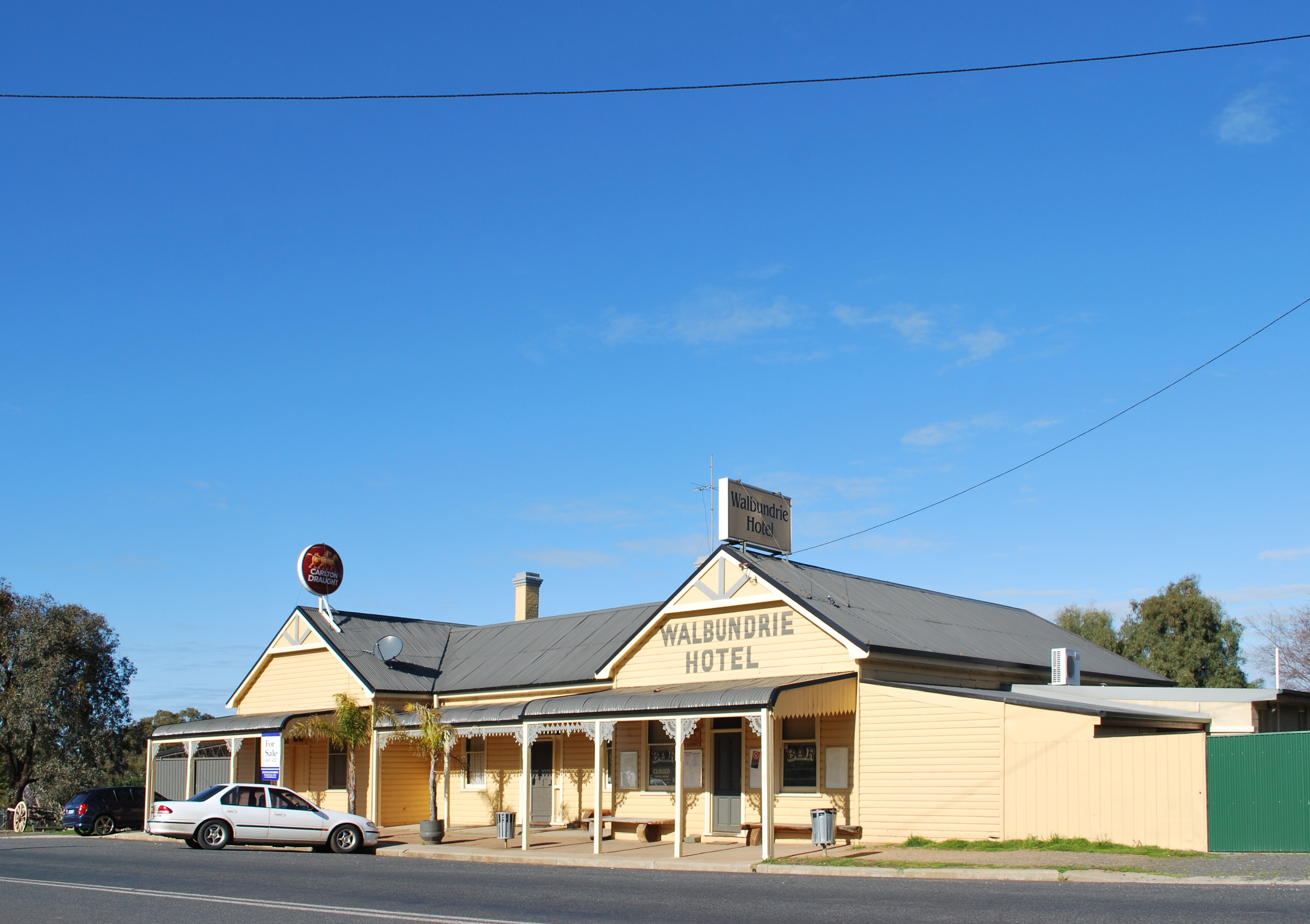
Walbundrie Hotel
