= David Willis (Australian footballer) =

Australian rules footballer

Personal information
- Born: 9 January 1968 (age 58)
- Original team: Henty (HFL)
- Height: 203 cm (6 ft 8 in)
- Weight: 98 kg (216 lb)

Playing career^{1}
| Years | Club | Games (Goals) |
| 1988–1991 | Sydney Swans | 25 (3) |
- ^{1} Playing statistics correct to the end of 1991.

David Willis (born 9 January 1968) is a former Australian rules footballer who played with the Sydney Swans in the Victorian/Australian Football League (VFL/AFL).

A ruckman, Willis came to Sydney from Hume Football League club Henty.

He first broke into the Swans team late in the 1988 season and remained in the side for the rest of the year, as well as the first 13 rounds in 1989, before being injured. His 1990 season didn't begin until round 20 due to a groin injury and he only played once in 1991. He was forced into retirement in 1992, when he broke a bone in his neck.
