= Hume County =

Hume
- Cadastral division
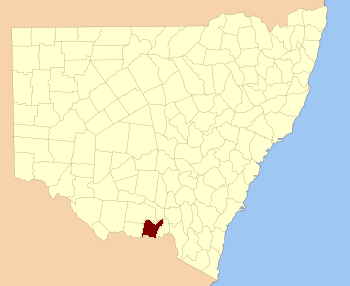
- Location in New South Wales
- Country: Australia
- State: New South Wales
Lands administrative divisions around Hume
| Urana | Urana | Mitchell |
| Denison | Hume | Goulburn |
| Moira (Vic) | Bogong (Vic) | Benambra (Vic) |

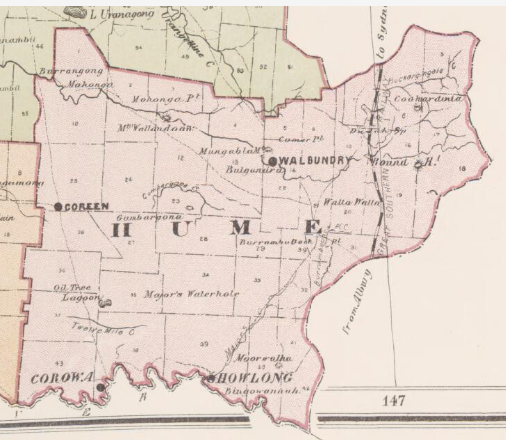
Map_of_Hume_County_(NSW)_Australia

Hume County is one of the 141 cadastral divisions of New South Wales. It contains the town of Culcairn.

Hume County was named in honour of the explorer Hamilton Hume (1797–1873).

== Parishes within this county ==
A full list of parishes found within this county; their current LGA and mapping coordinates to the approximate centre of each location is as follows:

| Parish | LGA | Coordinates |
|---|---|---|
| Billabong Forest | Federation Council | 35°44′54″S 146°18′04″E |
| Brocklesby | Greater Hume Shire Council | 35°47′54″S 146°39′04″E |
| Buckargingah | Greater Hume Shire Council | 35°29′54″S 147°09′04″E |
| Bulgandry | Greater Hume Shire Council | 35°35′12″S 146°38′19″E |
| Bungowannah | Greater Hume Shire Council | 36°00′54″S 146°48′04″E |
| Buraja | Federation Council | 35°52′54″S 146°24′04″E |
| Burrangong | Federation Council | 35°27′54″S 146°22′04″E |
| Burrangong | Federation Council | 35°29′54″S 146°22′04″E |
| Burrumbuttock | Greater Hume Shire Council | 35°48′54″S 146°47′04″E |
| Castlestead | Greater Hume Shire Council | 35°48′54″S 146°54′04″E |
| Collendina | Federation Council | 35°58′54″S 146°14′04″E |
| Comer | Greater Hume Shire Council | 35°29′54″S 147°01′04″E |
| Comer | Greater Hume Shire Council | 35°32′54″S 146°59′04″E |
| Corowa | Federation Council | 35°57′44″S 146°21′44″E |
| Creighton | Greater Hume Shire Council | 35°42′54″S 147°01′04″E |
| Gibson | Greater Hume Shire Council | 35°39′54″S 146°37′04″E |
| Goombargana | Greater Hume Shire Council | 35°42′54″S 146°37′04″E |
| Gordon | Federation Council | 35°38′54″S 146°19′04″E |
| Granville | Federation Council | 35°39′54″S 146°25′34″E |
| Gray | Federation Council | 35°50′54″S 146°16′04″E |
| Henty | Greater Hume Shire Council | 35°29′54″S 147°04′04″E |
| Henty | Greater Hume Shire Council | 35°35′54″S 147°00′04″E |
| Hindmarsh | Greater Hume Shire Council | 35°42′54″S 146°43′04″E |
| Hovell | Greater Hume Shire Council | 35°52′54″S 146°45′04″E |
| Howlong | Federation Council | 35°57′54″S 146°39′04″E |
| Kentucky | Federation Council | 35°51′54″S 146°32′04″E |
| Lowes | Federation Council | 35°46′54″S 146°25′04″E |
| Mahonga Forest | Federation Council | 35°31′54″S 146°29′04″E |
| Mahonga | Federation Council | 35°31′54″S 146°33′04″E |
| Moorwatha | Greater Hume Shire Council | 35°55′00″S 146°44′59″E |
| Morebringer | Greater Hume Shire Council | 35°53′54″S 146°37′04″E |
| Morven | Greater Hume Shire Council | 35°44′54″S 147°04′04″E |
| Osborne | Federation Council | 35°37′54″S 146°31′04″E |
| Piney Range | Greater Hume Shire Council | 35°44′54″S 146°49′04″E |
| Quat Quatta | Federation Council | 35°56′54″S 146°33′04″E |
| Rand | Federation Council | 35°29′54″S 146°27′04″E |
| Richmond | Federation Council | 35°46′54″S 146°32′04″E |
| Richmond | Federation Council | 35°44′54″S 146°30′04″E |
| Round Hill | Greater Hume Shire Council | 35°37′54″S 147°01′04″E |
| Ryan | Greater Hume Shire Council | 35°35′54″S 146°44′04″E |
| Sandy Ridges | Federation Council | 35°53′54″S 146°16′04″E |
| Sherwyn | Greater Hume Shire Council | 35°38′54″S 146°50′04″E |
| Stitt | Greater Hume Shire Council | 35°37′54″S 146°56′04″E |
| Thugga | Greater Hume Shire Council | 35°05′54″S 147°07′04″E |
| Walbundrie | Greater Hume Shire Council | 35°39′54″S 146°44′04″E |
| Walla Walla | Greater Hume Shire Council | 35°43′54″S 146°54′04″E |
| Wilson | Federation Council | 35°32′54″S 146°19′04″E |
