= Rand, New South Wales =

Rand New South Wales
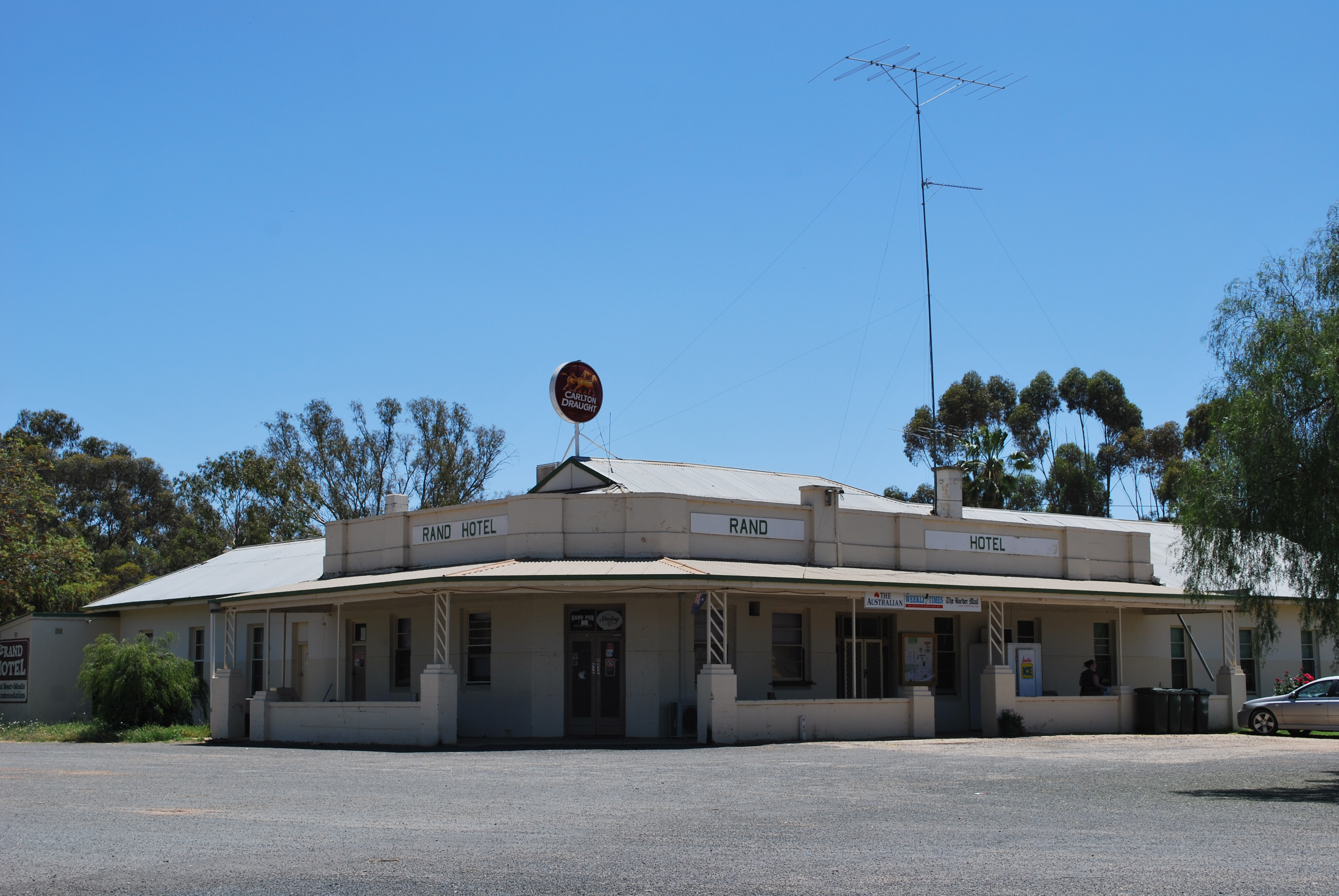
- Rand Hotel

- Coordinates: 35°36′S 146°34′E
- Population: 192 (2021 census)
- Postcode(s): 2642
- Location: 569 km (354 mi) from Sydney; 357 km (222 mi) from Melbourne; 117 km (73 mi) from Wagga Wagga; 79 km (49 mi) from Albury
- LGA(s): Federation Council
- County: Hume
- State electorate(s): Murray
- Federal division(s): Farrer

Rand is a town in the Riverina district of New South Wales, Australia. It is located in the Federation Council local government area. Based upon the 2011 census, Rand had a population of 575.

It was formerly the terminus of the Rand railway line from Henty, which opened in 1920 and closed in 1975.

Rand formerly had a rugby league team, formed in 1938, who competed in the Group 13 Rugby League competition.

Rand Post Office opened on 1 January 1926.

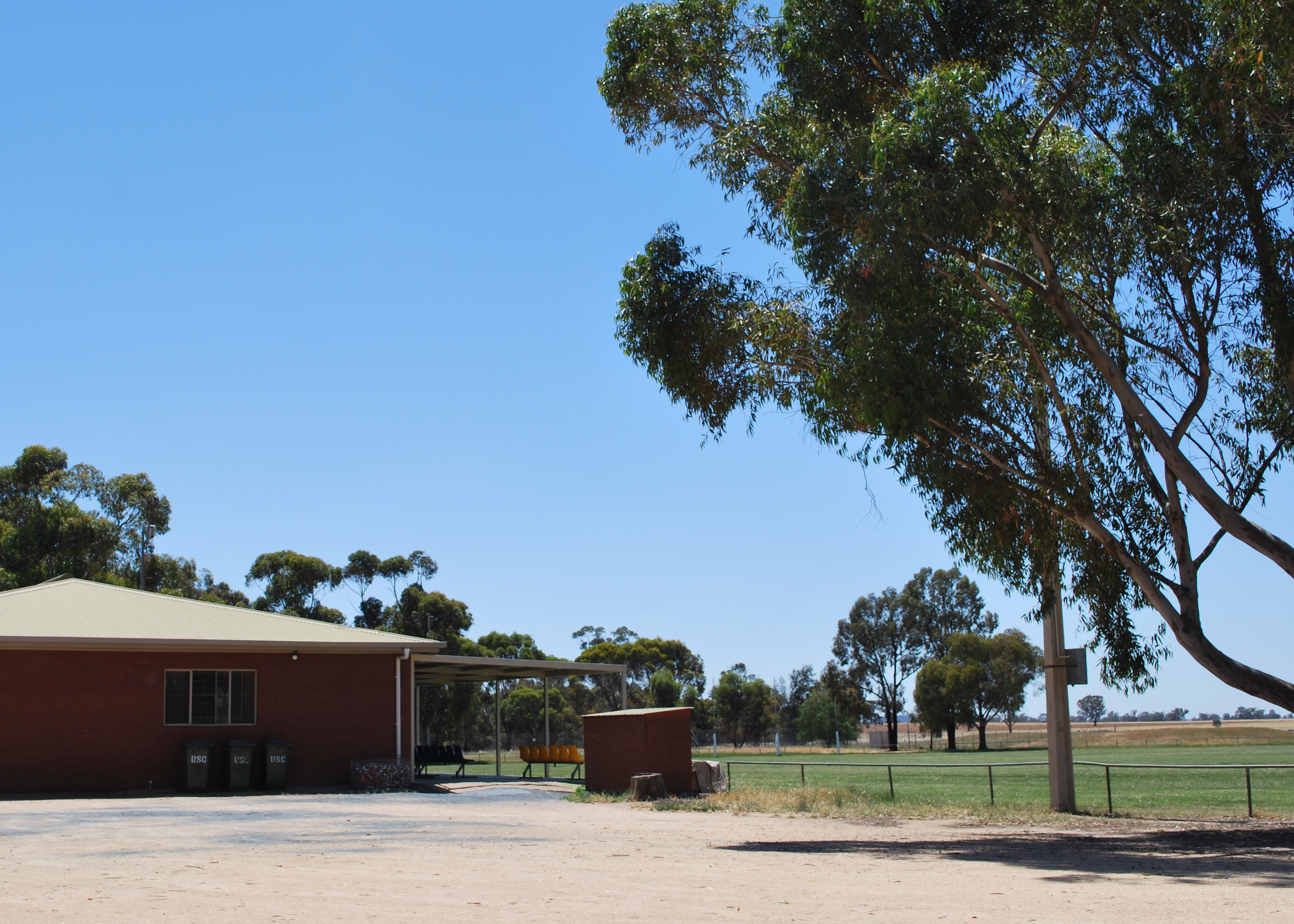
Rand Football Netball Ground
