= Henty, New South Wales =

Henty
- Town
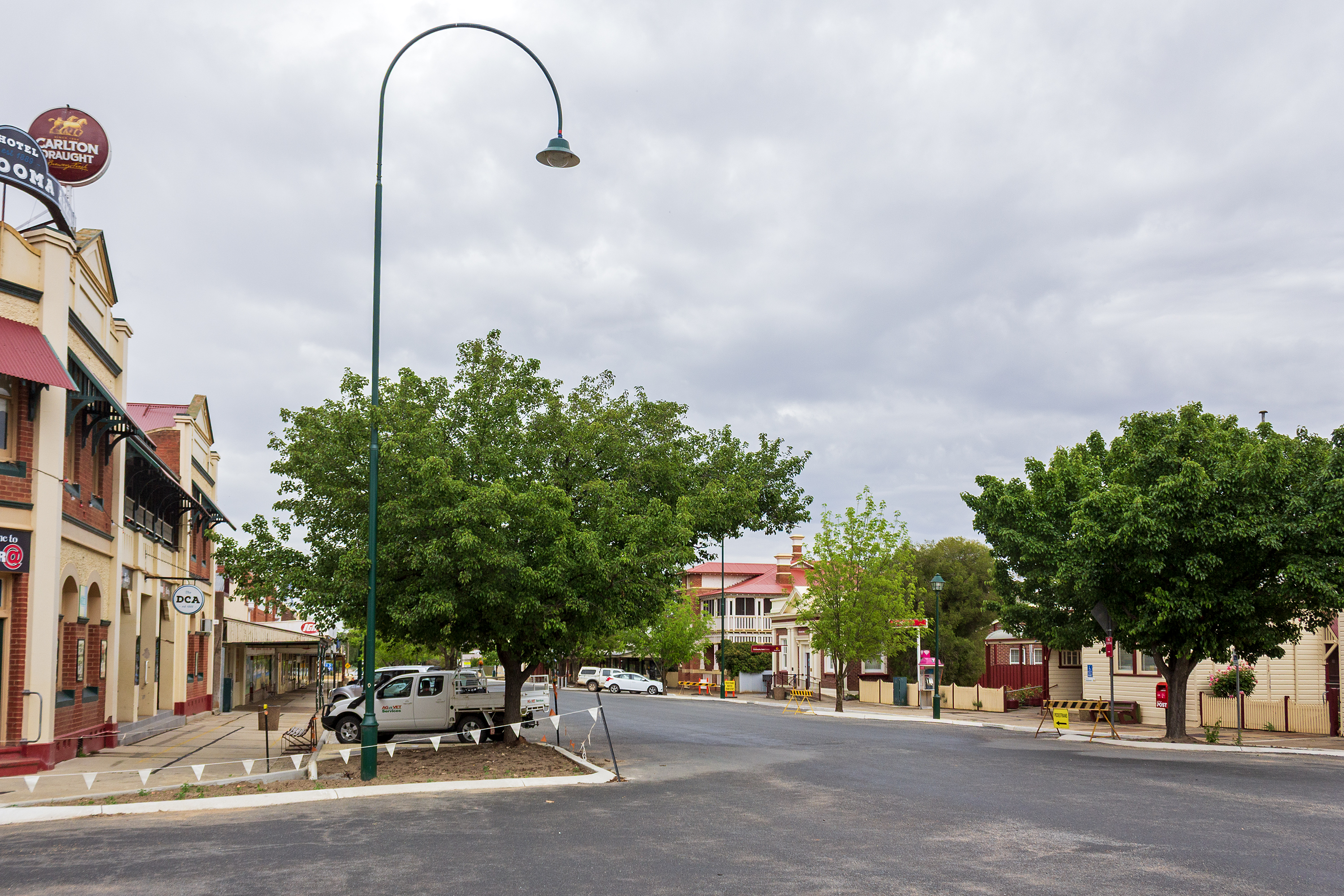
- Main street in October 2017

- Coordinates: 35°31′12″S 147°02′06″E
- Country: Australia
- State: New South Wales
- LGA: Greater Hume Shire
- Location: 65 km (40 mi) N of Albury; 63 km (39 mi) SW of Wagga Wagga; 30 km (19 mi) S of The Rock; 17 km (11 mi) N of Culcairn; 514 km (319 mi) SW of Sydney

Government
  - State electorate: Albury
  - Federal division: Farrer
- Elevation: 259 m (850 ft)

Population
  - Total: 1,237 (2016 census)
- Postcode: 2658
- County: Hume

Henty is a town in southwestern New South Wales close to the boundaries of the South West Slopes and the Riverina districts, almost midway between the regional cities of Albury and Wagga Wagga. At the 2006 census, Henty had a population of 863 people.

== History ==
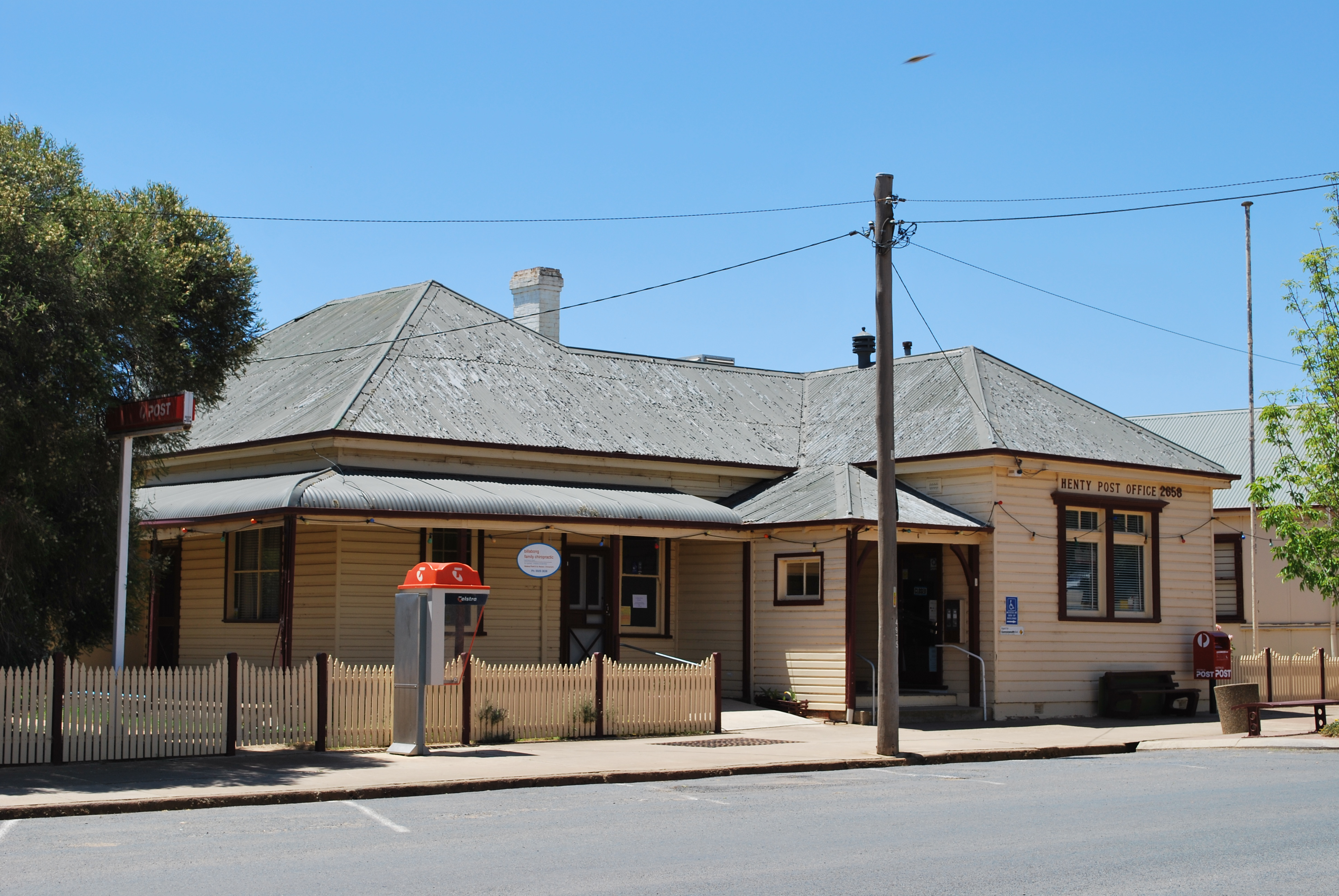
Henty Post Office

The first European explorer to visit and record the area was Major Thomas Mitchell in 1835. The first settlers arrived around 1850 were squatters, allowed to lease crown land. The area was known as 'Dudal Comer', Wiradjuri for 'Sweetest Water', with the first property station taking this name.

The village of Henty was originally called 'Doodle Cooma'. Nearby wetlands are still called Doodle Cooma Swamp; they cover 20 square kilometres and are a breeding area for water birds.

The post office changed its name in 1886 as the railway station's name was thought to be confused with Cooma in the Monaro district. The town's new name was after the Henty family of Portland, Victoria and Launceston, Tasmania. Henry Henty had leased Round Hill station north of Gerogery (south of Henty) in the early 1860s (some suggest the lessor was Edward Henty).

=== Sergeant Smyth ===
Bushranger Dan 'Mad Dog' Morgan operated in the area for a time. Two kilometres west of the town on Pleasant Hills Rd (the Lockhart road) is a memorial stone near the site where Morgan shot Sergeant Thomas Smyth in September 1864. A more recent plaque has been erected by the NSW Police Service and reads:

"A memorial to Senior Sergeant Thomas Smyth, aged 29. A member of the NSW Police Force shot by bushranger Dan Morgan in the surrounding hills on 4 September 1864. Senior Sergeant Smyth received a gunshot wound to his left shoulder and convalesced at the Imperial Hotel, Albury until 29 September 1864 where he haemorrhaged as a result of the gunshot wound and died. He is buried in an unmarked grave in the Albury cemetery. Dan Morgan was a murderer with a £1000 price on his head. Senior Sergeant Smyth gave his life while in the pursuit of Morgan who although a tourist attraction these days put fear in the people of the district in the 1860s."

Smyth had been in pursuit of Morgan, who was already wanted for several murders. It is reported that Morgan crept into Smyth's tent at night, and shot the sleeping Sergeant.

=== German settlement and railway connection ===
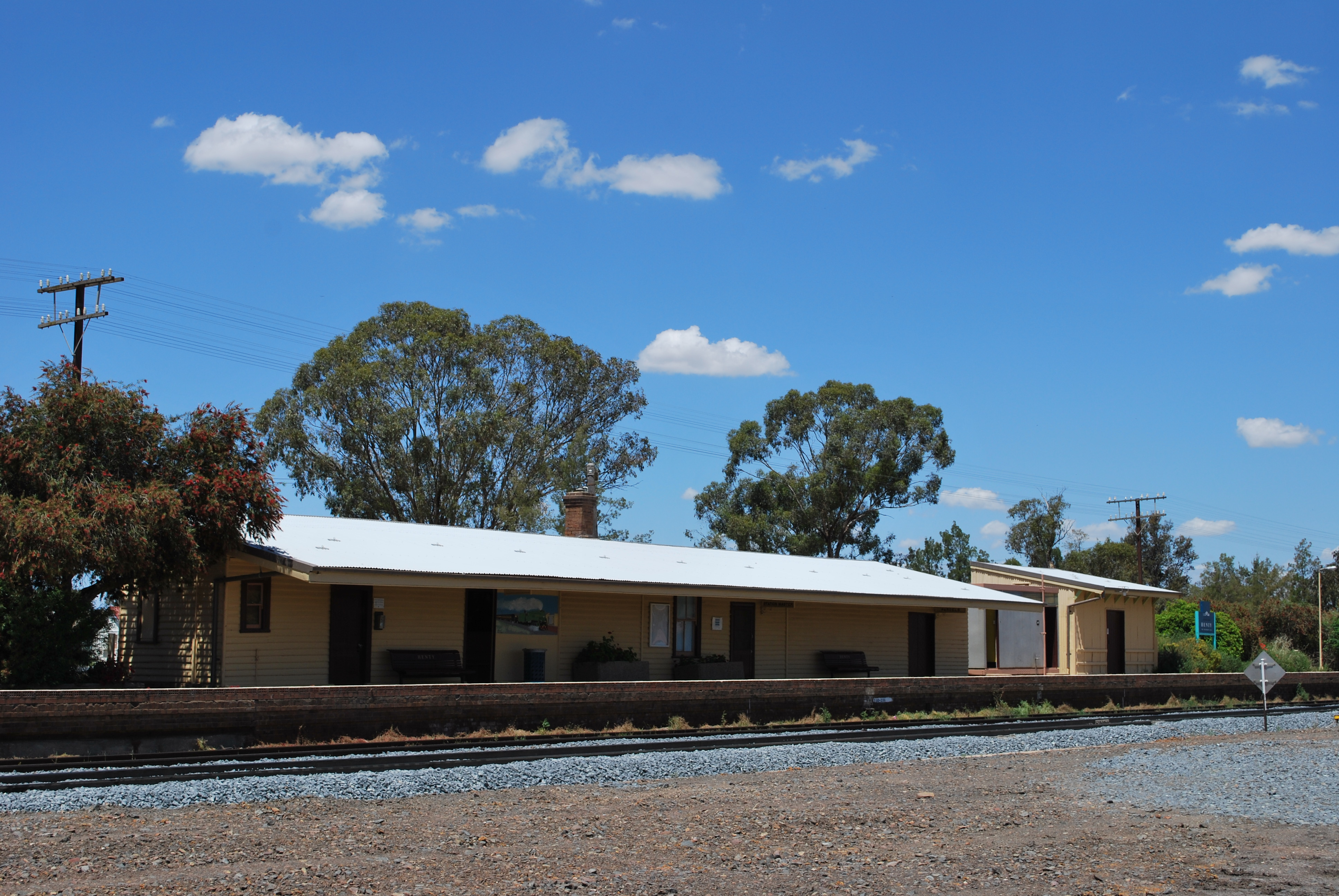
Henty railway station

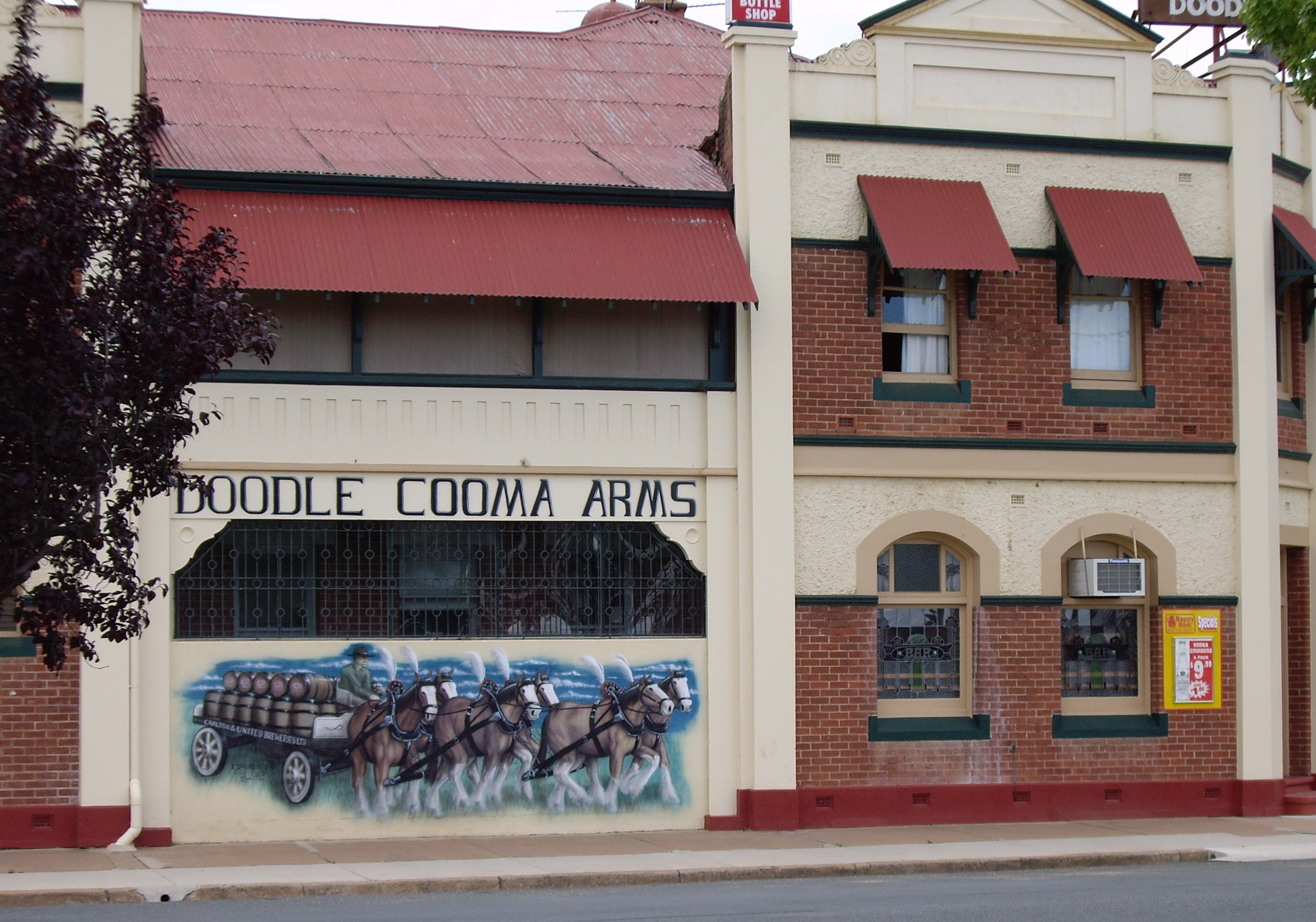
Doodle Cooma Arms Hotel

Around 1868, many families of German extraction, following the Murray River, trekked from South Australia towards nearby Albury eventually settling in the Henty District.

In 1880 the main railway line from Sydney to Albury passed the settlement. The first store opened in 1885 and a railway siding was constructed. In 1886, the Land Department authorised a survey of part of Doodle Cooma Station, changing the spelling from 'Dudal Comer'. Doodle Cooma Post Office opened on 16 December 1886 at the rail platform, and was renamed Henty in 1891. The village of Henty was named in 1888.

The Doodle Cooma Arms Hotel was built in 1889. The first school was established in 1892. In 1895 'Government Dam' was excavated. The first police officer was appointed to the town in 1899. The Bank of New South Wales opened a branch in 1897. The bank was held up in 1901: the only bank robbery in Henty with both men captured – one later died of wounds received during the hold-up.

=== Combine harvester ===
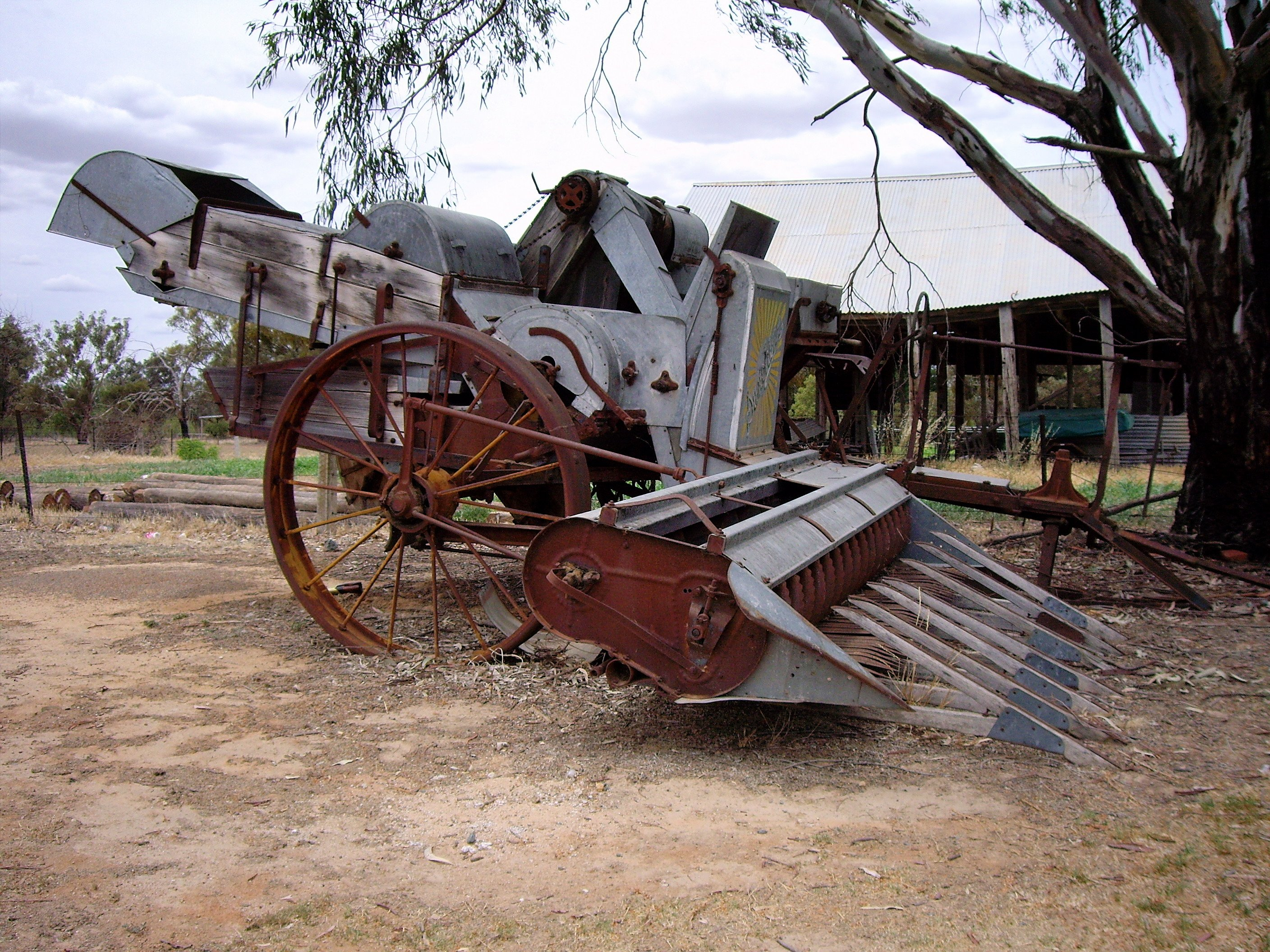
Old style harvester

In 1914, a local farmer named Headlie Taylor invented the header harvester which revolutionised the grain industry worldwide when it became commercially available in 1916. The harvester was superior to previous harvesters as it could 'lift' the heads of damaged crops and collect grain that would otherwise be lost. It was also more efficient, cutting the wheat heads rather than beating or pulling them off. The new technology was more reliable and compact than the stripper harvester and was manufactured by the McKay Harvesting and Machinery Co of Sunshine, Victoria. The header harvester was of significant economic value for Australia as its huge harvesting capacity aided the trend of bulk handling of wheat in Australia.

=== Depression years – "The Henty Man" ===
During the time of the great depression it was common for itinerant workers to walk from town to town in search of work - these men (they were almost always men) were known at the time as "swaggies". One such worker is celebrated in the "Henty Man" tree, located on the Olympic Highway about 7 km south of the township. Although the original has since been replaced, the local folklore is that a "swaggie" painted the words, "Henty 5mi" onto a stump that resembled a pointing man. The stump was whitewashed, with gloves, boots, a belt, and a swag strap in black. The comical figure was later crowned by a tin top hat made by a local Blacksmith, Charles Schlue. The new "Henty Man" tree is a popular stopping point for visitors to the area and the figure is an icon of the town, featuring on many souvenirs of Henty.

=== Recent history ===
In 1998, Henty was the first town in New South Wales to open a community bank under the Bendigo Bank franchise. A rebuilt district hospital has opened in October 2004 and a retirement village was built in the town with approval for the project being given in late 2005.

In 1986 the Henty Centenary Committee published From Early Beginnings. Henty NSW. Home of the Header. Centenary 1886–1986. In 2004 Henty held its centenary show.

== Heritage listings ==
Henty has a number of heritage-listed sites, including:

- Main Southern railway: Henty railway station

== Demography ==
In 1996, the population of Henty was 878. In 2001 the census counted 856 people. Of these 779 were born in Australia. 11 described themselves as Aboriginal. The unemployment rate was 6.3%. The median age was 43. The mean household size was 2.3. The median weekly income for individuals was $200–299; for families was $600–699; and for households $400–499.

== Henty field days ==
The Henty machinery field days are held on the Tuesday, Wednesday and Thursday of the third week in September each year. Over 60,000 people visit the field days over the two-and-a-half-day period. There are over 600 exhibitors each year. It is one of the largest in Southern Australia and displays new agricultural equipment and technology for farmers. The first of these modern field days was held in 1963. The field days are now held at a permanent all-weather rural exhibition site with broad display avenues including a square kilometre (250 acres) of car parking however the on-site airstrip created in 1976 was later closed.

== Transport ==
The local railway station is served by the New South Wales XPT passenger service between Melbourne and Sydney. The Olympic Highway runs through the town.

== Sport ==
In Australian rules football the Henty Football (Netball) Club (established 1895) are based out of the Henty Showground and compete in the Hume Football Netball League. It has won 5 senior premierships, the most recent in 2014 and has produced several AFL players, including - David Willis, Brent Piltz and brothers, Sam Murray and Nick Murray.

The club also has a netball team. Henty's rugby league team formerly competed in the Group 13 Rugby League competition. In 1940 they were awarded the Clayton Cup as the best team in the entire NSW Country Rugby League.

== Notable people ==
- Vin Bourke, Australian rules footballer
- Nick Murray, Australian rules footballer
- David Willis, Australian rules footballer

== Gallery ==
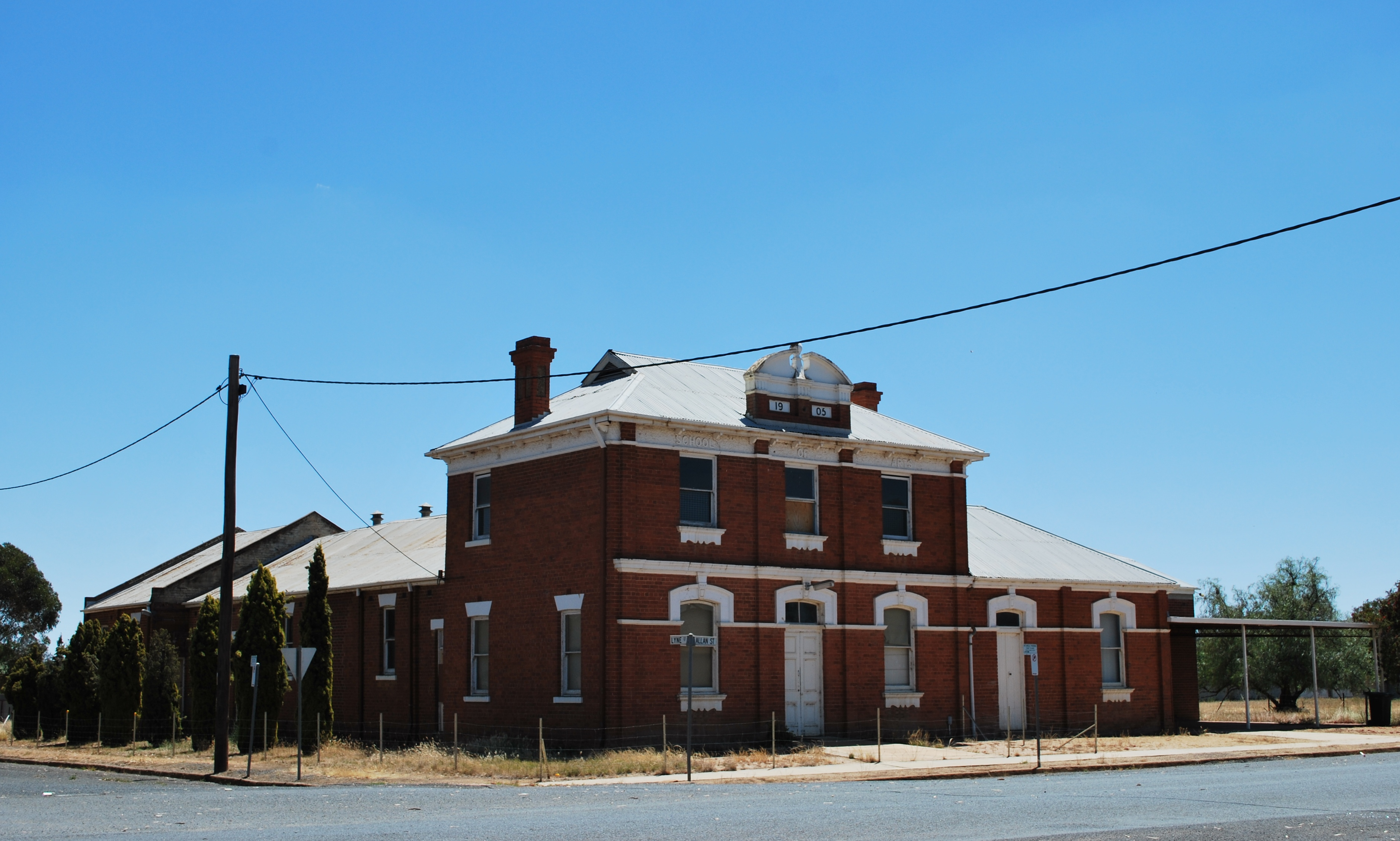
School of Arts dated 1905

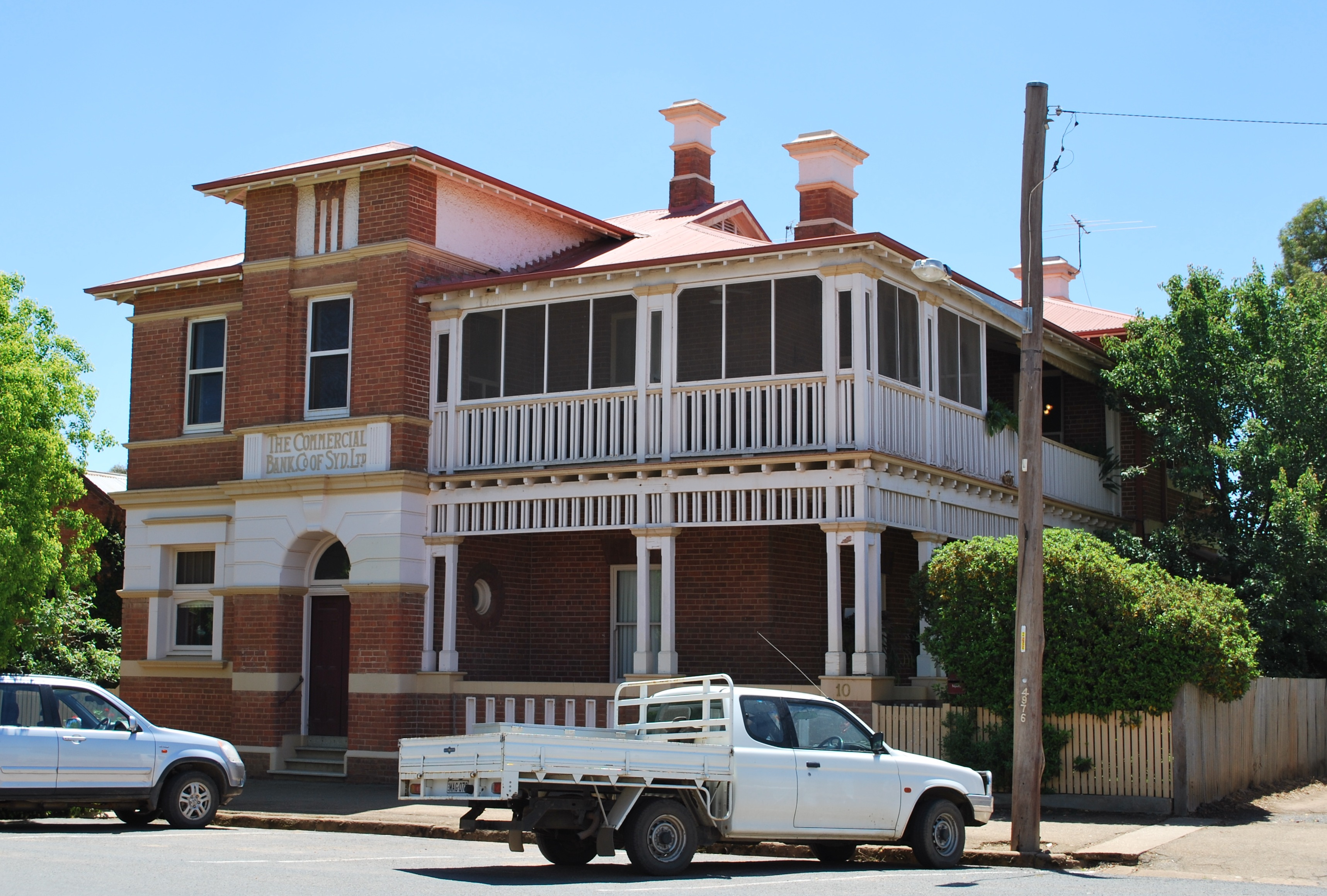
The former CBC Bank building

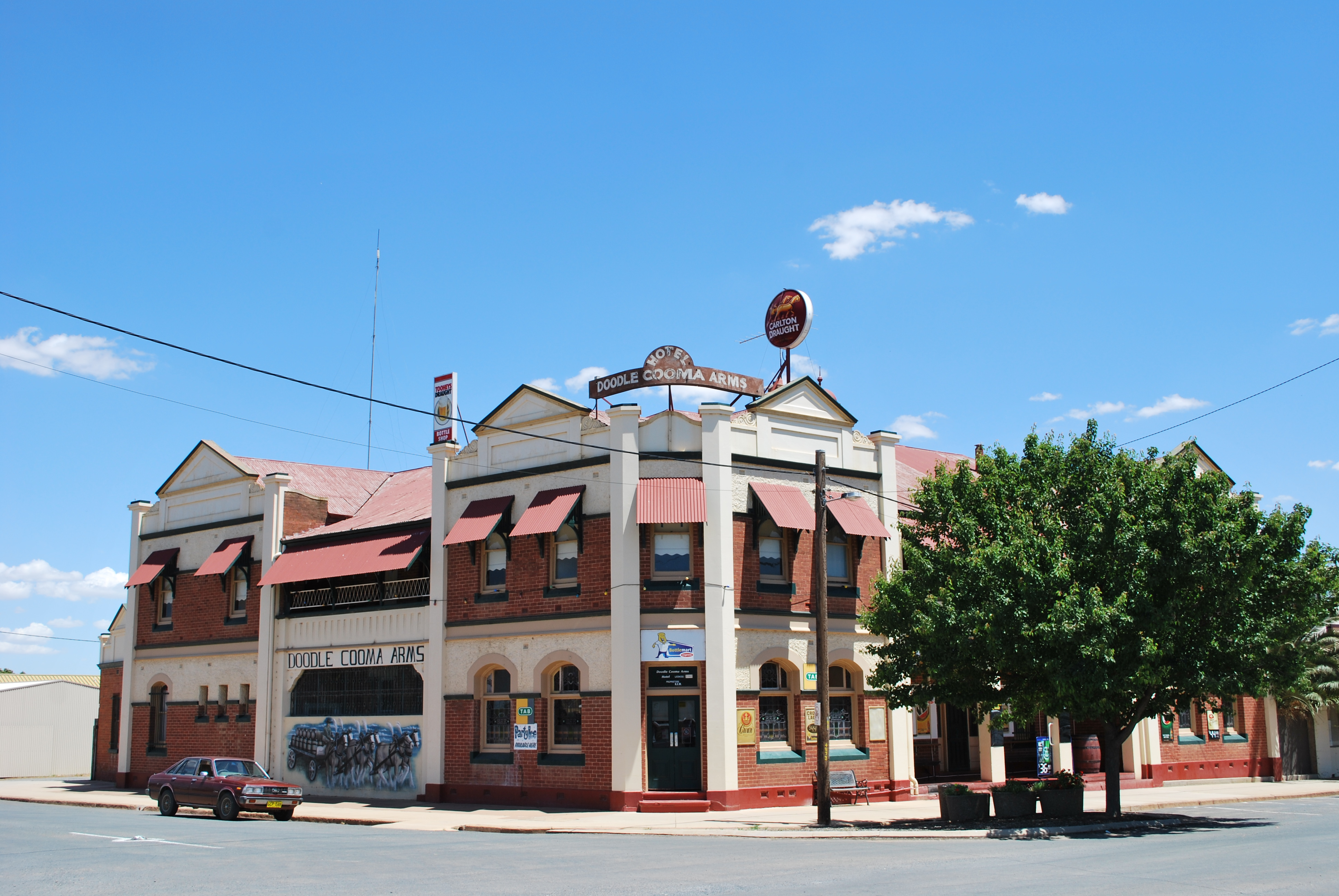
Doodle Cooma Arms
