= Coreen Shire =

Former local government area in New South Wales, Australia

- Local government area
- Country: Australia
- State: New South Wales
- Region: Riverina
- Established: 16 May 1906
- Abolished: 10 June 1955
- Council seat: Corowa

Coreen Shire was a local government area in the Riverina region of New South Wales, Australia.

Coreen Shire was established in 1906 and its offices were based in the town of Corowa. Localities in the Shire included Balldale, Buraja, Coreen, Daysdale, Lowesdale, Hopefield, Rennie, Savernake and Warragoon.

In 1955 Coreen Shire was merged with the Municipality of Corowa to form Corowa Shire.
