= Coreen & District Football League =

Australian rules football competition

- Formerly: Coreen & District Football Association
- Founded: 1909
- Folded: 2007
- No. of teams: 6

The Coreen & District Football League was an Australian rules football competition in the Coreen district of the Riverina in New South Wales, initially formed in 1909. The netball competition commenced in 1972 in line with the football fixture. The league was disbanded at the end of the 2007 season after 99 years of competition.

== History ==
=== 1901 to 1931 ===
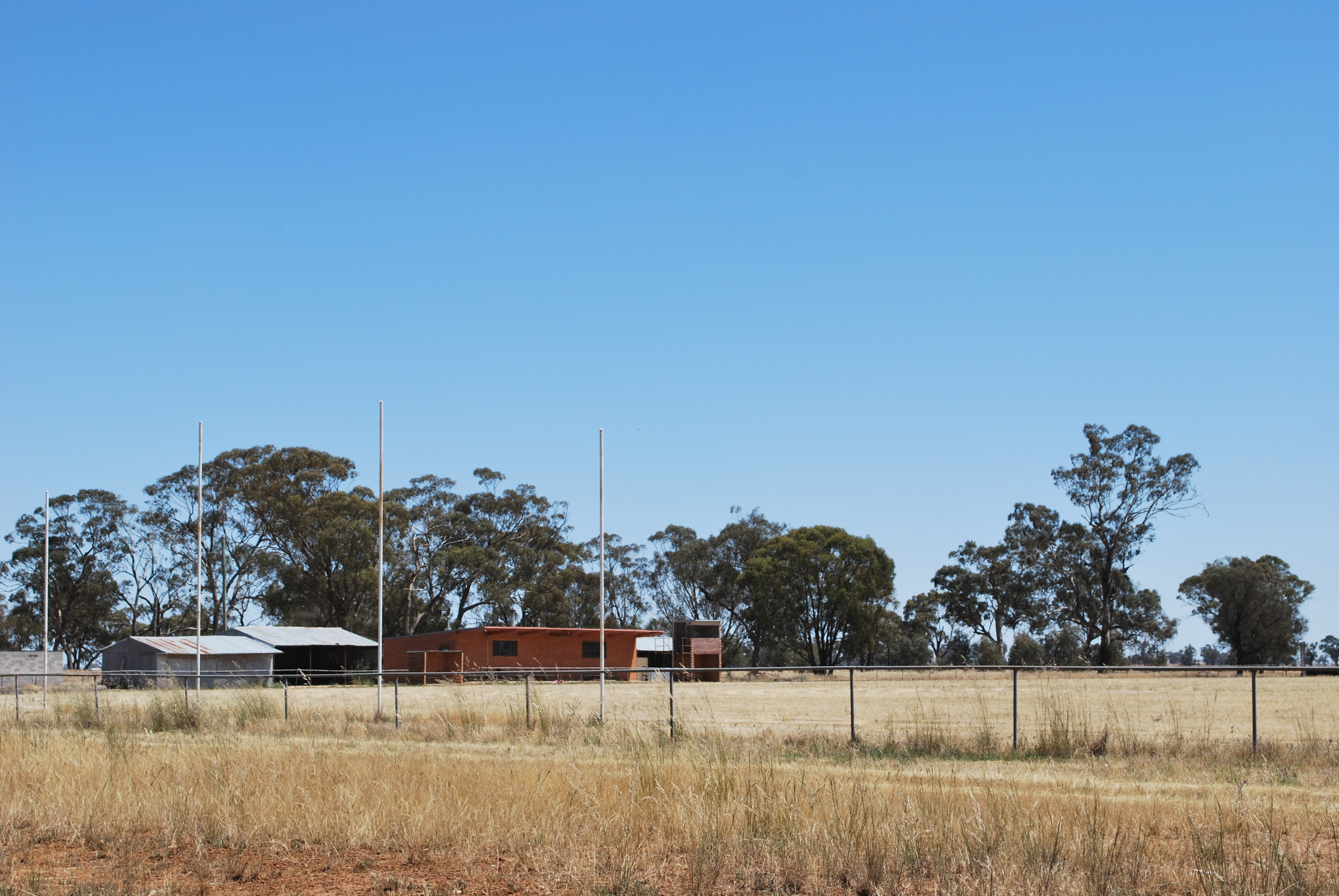
Daysdale Football Ground

It appears that the Coreen & District Football Association superseded the Federal Football Association and was formed after a meeting at Matt O'Brien's Burraja Hotel in April, 1909, from the following teams of – Burrajaa, Coreen, Redlands, Ringwood and Shannonvale. The Urana District Football Association was also formed in 1909 and catered for the Daysdale, Oaklands and Urana football clubs.

Over the years the Coreen and District Football Association appears to have had a number of minor name changes to its title, swapping between "Shire" and "District" depending on the journalist's review of a meeting or what the newspaper editor chose as the association's name at that particular time or the title may have been abbreviated in the newspaper. It is difficult to accurately state what the official title of the association was without viewing the official minutes of meetings. What is of particular importance is the actual club's that competed in the association each year.

In 1915, there was some opposition from locals expressing their opinion that young men playing football, would be better off serving their King and Country in the trenches to fight the enemies of the Empire, but the season was completed before going into recess from 1916 to 1918 due to WW1.

In 1917, former Coreen Settler's FC captain, Ambrose Charles Filliponi was killed in action in France.

The most radical change came in 1931, when the Coreen & DFA folded and three clubs joined the Corowa & District Football Association, then in 1936, the Corowa & DFA officially changed its title to the Coreen & DFA. More details below in the "History:1930 to 2007" section.

Coreen FC played in nine consecutive grand finals between 1924 and 1931, winning three Coreen & DFA premierships in 1926, 1929 and 1930.

There were a number of football associations formed in the early 1900s that local club's played in prior joining the Coreen & District Football Association in 1909. These associations played a vital role in providing football competitions in the Riverina and along the Murray River in local football's formative years prior to the Coreen & DFA being established in 1909.

Riverina Football Association – 1901 Teams
Bull Plain, Burryjaa, Clear Hills, Daysdale. Premiers: Burryjaa FC
Clear Hills Football Association – 1902 – 1903

- 1902 Teams: Burryjaa, Clear Hills, Daysdale and Savernake. Premiers: Savernake FC
- 1903 Teams: Clear Hills, Daysdale and Savernake. Premiers: Daysdale FC.
- 1904 – The re-forming of Clear Hills Football Association fell through as Clear Hills FC refused to play against Daysdale, under their present captain. Savernake then joined the Berrigan Football Association.

Federal Football Association – 1905 to 1908

There was a Riverina football competition established in 1905 around the Corowa and Mulwala area called the Federal Football Association.

- 1905 Teams: Burryjaa, Daysdale and Savernake, 1905 premiers: Daysdale FC
- 1906 Teams: Clear Hills, Coreen, Daysdale and Savernake, 1906 Premiers: Daysdale defeated Clear Hills in the grand final.
- 1907 Teams: Burryja, Clear Hills, Coreen, Daysdale and Savernake with Clear Hills and Daysdale tying on ladder points for the premiership. 1907 Premiers: Clear Hills defeated Daysdale in the play off to win the 1907 premiership.
- 1908 Teams: Burryja, Balldale, Coreen, Daysdale, Ringwood and Savernake. In 1908 there was very little football information available in the newspapers, but the Federal FA did advertise for Umpires in May, 1908. and in a May, 1908 article it states that Balldale FC joined a Coreen & District Football Association competition ? In the grand final, Balldale defeated Daysdale at Burrajaa to win the 1908 grand final.

Corowa & District Football Association – 1906 & 1907.

In 1906 the Corowa and District Football Association was formed and the following teams entered this competition – Balldale, Burryjaa, Corowa, Howlong and Wahgunyah. Corowa Football Club went onto win the premiership, finishing on top of the ladder, with seven wins from eight games. In 1907, Burrajaa joined the Federal FA, and the Corowa & DFA premiership was won by the Wahgunyah Football Club. In 1908, Corowa and Wahgunyah joined the Ovens & Murray Football Association, while Howlong FC won the Ovens & Murray Junior Football Association premiership in 1908.

Note: The football club of Burrajaa, Burryjaa, Burryja, was spelt in a variety of ways in various newspapers between 1900 and 1950, with the most recent spelling of the club being settled as – "Buraja".

== Teams in the Coreen & DFL: 1909 to 1930 ==
- 1909: Coreen & District Football Association Teams:5. Burrajaa, Coreen, Redlands, Ringwood and Shannonvale.
- 1910: Coreen District Football Association Teams:6. Burrajaa, Burrajaa Village, Coreen, Coreen Settlers, Daysdale and Ringwood.
- 1911: Coreen Shire Football Association Teams:6. Burrajaa, Burrajaa Village, Coreen, Coreen Settlers, Daysdale and Savernake.
- 1912: Coreen District Football Association Teams:4. Burrajaa Village, Coreen Settler's, Daysdale and Oaklands.
- 1913: Coreen & District Football Association Teams:4. Burryjaa, Coreen, Coreen Settlers and Daysdale.
- 1914: Coreen Shire Football Association. Teams:7. Balldale, Burrajaa, Burrajaa Village, Coreen, Coreen Settlers, Daysdale and Ringwood.
- 1915: Coreen Shire Football Association Teams:6. Balldale, Daysdale, Coreen Settlers, Lowesdale, Lowesdale Military and Redlands.
- 1916–1918: In recess – World War I
- 1919: Coreen District Football Association consisting of following five teams – Balldale, Buraja, Coreen, Daysdale and Oaklands.
- 1920: Coreen District Football Association. Teams:6. Balldale, Burraja, Coreen, Corowa, Daysdale and Oaklands.
- 1921: Coreen & District Football Association. Teams:6. Balldale, Burryjaa, Coreen, Daysdale, Hopefield and Ringwood.
- 1922: Coreen Football Association. Teams:7. Balldale, Burryjaa, Coreen, Daysdale, Hopefield, Ringwood and Wahgunyah.
- 1923: Coreen Football Association. Teams:4. Balldale, Burryjaa, Coreen and Daysdale.
- 1924: Coreen & District Football Association. Teams:5. Burrajaa, Coreen, Daysdale, Ringwood and Savernake.
- 1925: Coreen & District Football Association. Teams:6. Buraja, Coreen, Daysdale, Oaklands, Ringwood and Savernake.
- 1926: Coreen & District Football Association. Teams:6. Buraja, Coreen, Daysdale, Oaklands, Ringwood and Savernake.
- 1927: Coreen & District Football Association. Teams:6. Buraja, Coreen, Daysdale, Oaklands, Ringwood and Savernake.
- 1928: Coreen & District Football Association. Teams:6. Buraja, Coreen, Daysdale, Oaklands, Ringwood and Savernake.
- 1929: Coreen & District Football Association. Teams:6. Buraja, Coreen, Daysdale, Oaklands, Rand and Urana.
- 1930: Coreen & District Football Association. Teams:6. Coreen, Daysdale, Oaklands, Rand, Savernake and Urana.
- 1930: Corowa & District Football Association. Teams:6. Balldale, Brocklesby, Burraja, Corowa Stars, Howlong and Wahgunyah.

The season of 1930 ended in dispute. Oaklands had played a man named Kennedy, with whom didn't meet the associations residency rules. A protest by the Coreen club led to the forfeiture of points and thus expulsion from the finals. Oaklands appealed the decision but the matter was not heard until long after the season and finals had been played. Eventually the appeal by Oaklands was upheld. Ill will between clubs led to Urana and Oaklands withdrawing from the association and joining another competition. The remaining clubs knowing that a three team competition wasn't ideal so they sort to play elsewhere.

- 1931: Coreen, Daysdale and Rand joined the Corowa & District FA in 1931, while Oaklands and Urana joined the Southern Riverina Football Association in 1931. In 1932, Oaklands and Urana both joined the Corowa & District Football Association, while Rand joined the Central Hume Football League in 1932.

=== 1930 to 2007 ===
The 1930 season of Coreen & District Football Association competition coincided with the first season of the Corowa and District Football Association, with Balldale winning the first of three consecutive Corowa & DFA premierships.

As a result of a protest by the Oaklands FC and then an appeal to the Wagga Football Council and NSW National Football League as to the make up of the 1930 Coreen and District Football Association finals series and participating teams, due to a dispute over the eligibility of an Oaklands player, the Coreen & DFA folded after a delegates meeting in May, 1931, when it was moved 'that the forming of the association be temporarily suspended' with Coreen, Daysdale and Rand then joining the Corowa & DFA competition in 1931. Balldale then went on to defeat Coreen in the 1931 Corowa & District FA grand final.

The Corowa and District competition ran from 1930 until 1935 when it took on the Coreen & District FA's name at its 1936 Annual General Meeting.

In 1930, Mr. Jack Anderson – Balldale FC and W Hall – Howlong FC tied for the Pearce Medal for the best and fairest player award in the Corowa & District Football Association

Corowa Stars played in the Corowa & District FA from 1930 to 1933. Corowa Stars decided to reform after their 1934 – AGM, but it appears they never got up and going and did not enter a team in any local competition and ultimately folded.

Rand were undefeated during their 1937 premiership year.

In 1944, there was a Coreen & District Junior Patriotic Football Association with Rennie defeating Coreen in the grand final at Coreen.

There was a Coreen & District Junior Football League in 1945 with Oaklands defeating Rennie in the grand final which was played at Coreen.

The Coreen & District Football Association reformed in April, 1946 after WW2 from the following six clubs – Coreen, Daysdale, Hopefield, Oaklands, Rennie and Urana.

In 1953, Coreen FC President, Jack Kingston was re-elected for the 49th year.

Daysdale played in six consecutive grand finals between 1961 and 1966, winning three premierships in 1961, 1962 and 1964.

The junior (Under 16) competition commenced in 1975 and proved to be a very worth while breeding ground for future players, with several going onto to play VFL / AFL football, such as – John Longmire, Adam Houlihan, Damian Houlihan and Taylor Duryea.

In 1994 the league comprised ten clubs: Coleambally, Coreen, Daysdale, Hopefield-Buraja, Jerilderie, Oaklands, Rand, Rennie, Urana and Victorian club Wahgunyah. It was also in that year that the Daysdale FC celebrated their 100th anniversary and they went onto win the senior football premiership.

Jerilderie played in seven consecutive grand finals between 1995 and 2001, but only won two in 1999 and 2001.

The Billabong Crows FC were formed when the Oaklands Football Club and Urana Football Club, both of which had been long standing rivals in the Coreen & District Football League, elected to merge in 2004.

The six remaining Coreen & DFL clubs joined the following leagues during the 2007 post-season.

- Billabong Crows: Hume Football League
- Coreen-Daysdale-Hopefield-Buraja United: Hume Football League
- Coleambally: Hume Football League (Joined Farrer Football League in 2011)
- Jerilderie: Picola & District Football League
- Rennie: Hume Football League (Joined Picola & District Football League in 2009)
- Wahgunyah: Tallangatta & District Football League

== Clubs ==
=== Final ===
Club	Jumper	Nickname	Home Ground	Former League	Est.	Years in C&DFL	C&DFL Senior Premierships		Fate
Club	Jumper	Nickname	Home Ground	Former League	Est.	Years in C&DFL	Total	Years	Fate
Billabong Crows		Crows	Oaklands Recreation Ground, Oaklands and Urana Recreation Ground, Urana	–	2004	2004-2007	0	-	Moved to Hume FNL following 2007 season
Coreen-Daysdale-Hopefield-Buraja United		Saints	Coreen Oval, Coreen and Buraja Recreation Reserve, Lowesdale	–	2006	2006-2007	2	2006, 2007	Moved to Hume FNL following 2007 season
Coleambally		Blues	Coleambally Sports Grounds, Coleambally	B&DFL, MFL	1965	1972-1979, 1984-2007	6	1976, 1977, 1979, 1998, 1993, 2005	Played in Murray FL between 1980-83. Moved to Hume FNL following 2007 season
Jerilderie		Demons	Jerilderie Recreation Reserve, Jerilderie	MFL	1891	1957-1963, 1994-2007	4	1963, 1999, 2000, 2003	Played in Murray FL between 1964-93. Moved to Picola & District FNL following 2007 season
Rennie	(1932-?)(1960s)(?-2007	Hoppers	Rennie Recreation Reserve, Rennie	–	1932	1932-2007	12	1938, 1939, 1940, 1952, 1954, 1955, 1969, 1970, 1972, 1983, 1985, 1992	Moved to Hume FNL following 2007 season
Wahgunyah	(1922-39)(1947-49)(1957-2007)	Tigers	Wahgunyah Recreation Reserve, Wahgunyah	C&DFA	1908	1922, 1930, 1948-1949, 1957-2007	5	1968, 1997, 1998, 2002, 2004	Played in Chiltern & District FA between 1923–29, 1931-1937 and 1950-57. Moved to Tallangatta & District FL following 2007 season

=== Former ===
Club	Jumper	Nickname	Home Ground	Former League	Est.	Years in C&DFL	C&DFL Senior Premierships		Fate
Club	Jumper	Nickname	Home Ground	Former League	Est.	Years in C&DFL	Total	Years	Fate
Balldale	(1930–34)(1974–77)	Magpies, Blue and Golds	Balldale Cricket Ground, Balldale	C&DFA, RFA, HFL	1906	1914-1923, 1930-1934, 1974-1977	7	1921, 1922, 1923, 1930, 1931, 1932, 1934	Moved to Riverina FA following 1923 season. Moved to Chiltern & District FA following 1934 season. Folded after 1977 season
Blighty		Redeyes	Blighty Recreation Reserve, Blighty	MFL Reserve Grade	1949	1965-1968	1	1965	Moved to Picola & District FNL following 1968 season
Boree Creek		Creekers, Magpies	Boree Creak Recreation Reserve, Boree Creek	MFL, HFL	1886	1948, 1977-1979	0	-	Moved to Central Riverina FL following 1948 and 1979 seasons
Brocklesby		Kangaroos	Brocklesby Recreation Reserve, Brocklesby	RFA	1907	1930	0	-	Moved to Albury & District FA following 1930 season
Buraja			Buraja Recreation Reserve, Lowesdale	FFA, C&DFA	1900s	1909-1911, 1913-1915, 1919-1949	1	1924	Recess in 1912. Merged with Burrajaa Village to form Lowesdale in 1915, re-formed in 1919. Merged with Hopefield to form Hopefield-Buraja following 1949 season
Burrajaa Village			Buraja Recreation Reserve, Lowesdale	–	1900s	1910-1912, 1914	0	-	Recess in 1913. Merged with Burrajaa to form Lowesdale following 1914 season,
Coreen		Swans	Coreen Oval, Coreen	FFA	1900s	1909-1911, 1913-1915, 1919-1994	14	1919, 1926, 1929, 1930, 1933, 1946, 1947, 1951, 1974, 1975, 1978, 1980, 1987, 1991	Recess in 1912. Merged with Daysdale to form Coreen-Daysdale following 1994 season
Coreen-Daysdale		Saints	Coreen Oval, Coreen	–	1995	1995-2005	0	-	Merged with Hopefield-Buraja to form Coreen-Daysdale-Hopefield-Buraja United following 2005 season
Coreen Settlers			Coreen Oval, Coreen	–	1900s	1910-1915	2	1913, 1914	Merged with Coreen in 1915 season
Corowa		Spiders	John Foord Oval, Corowa	O&MFA	1877	1920	1	1920	Returned to Ovens & Murray FA following 1920 season
Corowa Stars		Stars	John Foord Oval, Corowa	C&DFA	1926	1930-1934	0	-	Folded after 1934 AGM
Daysdale		Magpies	Daysdale Oval, Daysdale	UFA	1900s	1910-1994	7	1910, 1911, 1912, 1961, 1962, 1964, 1994	Merged with Coreen to form Coreen-Daysdale following 1994 season
Hopefield	Dark			–	1920s	1922, 1946-1949	0	-	In recess between 1923-1945. Merged with Buraja to form Hopefield-Buraja following 1949 season
Hopefield-Buraja		Bulldogs	Buraja Recreation Reserve, Lowesdale	–	1950	1950-2003	6	1950, 1960, 1973, 1982, 1995, 1996	In recess in 2004 and 2005, merged with Coreen-Daysdale to form Coreen-Daysdale-Hopefield-Buraja United following 2005 season
Lowesdale			Buraja Recreation Reserve, Lowesdale	–	1915	1915	0	-	Entered recess due to WWI
Lowesdale Military				–	1915	1915	1	1915	Entered recess due to WWI
Mulwala		Lions	Lonsdale Reserve, Mulwala	BMFL	1882	1939-1940	0	-	In recess during WWII, re-formed in Murray Valley North East FL in 1946
Murray Magpies		Magpies	Urana Road Oval, Lavington	–	1997	1997-2006	1	2001	Moved to Hume FNL following 2006 season
Oaklands	(1912)(?-2003)	Hawks	Oaklands Recreation Ground, Oaklands	L&DFA, SRFA	1899	1912, 1919-1920, 1925-1930, 1932-2003	8	1927, 1928, 1929, 1935, 1956, 1971, 1981, 1989	Moved to Lockhart & District FA in 1913 and 1919. Played in Southern Riverina FA in 1931. Merged with Urana to form Billabong Crows following 2003 season
Rand	(1929-?)(?2005)	Pigeons	Rand Recreation Reserve, Rand	UFA, CHFA, HFA	1925	1929-1931, 1935-1944, 1984-2005	2	1936, 1937	Played in Central Hume FL between 1932–34 and Hume FL between 1945-83. Merged with Walbundrie to form Rand-Walbundrie in Hume FNL following 2005 season
Redlands				–	1909	1909, 1915	0	-	Folded after 1915 season
Ringwood				FFA	1908	1909-1910, 1914, 1921-1922, 1924-1928	2	1909, 1925	Absorbed by Redlands in 1915, re-formed in 1921. Folded after 1928 season
Rutherglen Reserves		Redlegs	Barkly Park, Rutherglen	–	1877	1950-1952	0	-	Moved to Ovens & Murray FA reserves competition following 1952 season
Rutherglen Corowa		Cats	Barkly Park, Rutherglen	–	1979	1979-1991	3	1984, 1986, 1990	Moved to Ovens & King FL following 1991 season
Savernake			Savernake Recreation Reserve, Savernake	SRFA	1900s	1911, 1924-1928, 1930	0	-	Recess between 1912-23. Played in Southern Riverina FA in 1929, folded after 1930 season
Shannonvale						1909	0	-	Folded after 1909 season
South Corowa			Morris Park, Corowa	–	1947	1947-1956	0	-	Folded after 1956 season
Urana (Urana-Cullivel 1952-1972)	(1929-?)(?-2003)	Spiders, Bombers	Urana Recreation Ground, Urana	L&DFA, SRFA, F&DFA	1920s	1927, 1929-1930, 1932-1935, 1946-2003	6	1953, 1957, 1958, 1959, 1966, 1967	Recess in 1928. Moved to Southern Riverina FA in 1931 and Faithful & District FA in 1936. Merged with Oaklands to form Billabong Crows following 2003 season

== Premierships: Football: 1930 to 2007 ==
Football		Seniors (1930–2007)		Reserves (1976–2007)		Thirds / Under 16's (1980–2007)		Fourths / Under 13's (2006–2007)	
Club	Total Flags	Flags	Premiership Years	Flags	Premiership Years	Flags	Premiership Years	Flags	Premiership Years
2007 Season
Billabong Crows (2004–2007)	00	00		00		00		00	
Coreen-Daysdale -Hopefield-Buraja United (2006–2007)	03	02	2006, 2007.	00		00		01	2007
Coleambally (1976–2007)	12	06	1976, 1977, 1979, 1988, 1993, 2005	04	1998, 1999, 2003, 2006	02	1995, 2001	00	
Jerilderie (1957–2007)	10	04	1963; 1999; 2000; 2003	00		06	1994, 1997, 2002, 2004, 2005, 2006	00	
Rennie (1936–2007)	20	12	1938, 1939, 1940, 1952, 1954, 1955, 1969, 1970, 1972, 1983, 1985, 1992	06	1980, 1983, 1989, 1990, 1995, 1996	01	1986	01	2006
Wahgunyah (1947–49 & 1955–2007)	18	07	1948, 1949, 1968, 1997, 1998, 2002, 2004	08	1977, 1978, 1984, 1997, 2001, 2002, 2004, 2007	03	1987, 1998, 2007	00	
Former Clubs
Balldale (1930–1934; 1974–1977)	04	04	1930, 1931, 1932, 1934	00		N/A	–	N/A	–
Blighty (1965–1968)	01	01	1965	N/A	–	N/A	–	N/A	–
Boree Creek (1976–1978)	00	00		00		N/A	–	N/A	–
Buraja (1930–1949)	00	00	–	N/A	–	N/A	–	N/A	–
Buraja Village (1910–1911)	00	00	–	N/A	–	N/A	–	N/A	–
Coreen (1931–1994)	14	10	1933, 1946, 1947, 1951, 1974, 1975, 1978, 1980, 1987, 1991	04	1991, 1992, 1993, 1994	00		N/A	–
Coreen-Daysdale (1995–2005)	01	00		01	2005	01	2003	N/A	–
Corowa Stars (1933–1940)	00	00	–	N/A	–	N/A	–	N/A	–
Daysdale (1931–1994)	04	04	1961, 1962, 1964, 1994	00		00		N/A	–
Hopefield-Buraja (1950–2003)	08	06	1950, 1960, 1973, 1982, 1995, 1996,	01	1981	01	1988	N/A	–
Mulwala (1939–1940)	00	00		N/A	–	N/A	–	N/A	–
Murray Magpies (1999–2006)	04	01	2001	01	2000	02	1999, 2000	00	
Oaklands (1932–2003)	09	05	1935, 1956, 1971, 1981, 1989	01	1976	03	1991, 1992, 1993	N/A	–
Rand (1935–2005)	03	02	1936, 1937	00		01	1996	N/A	–
Rutherglen-Corowa (1979–1991)	16	03	1984, 1986, 1990	06	1979, 1982, 1985, 1986, 1987, 1988	07	1980, 1981, 1982, 1983, 1984, 1985, 1990	N/A	–
Rutherglen 2nds (1950–1952)	00	00		N/A	–	N/A	–	N/A	–
South Corowa (1947–1956)	00	00		N/A	–	N/A	–	N/A	–
Urana (1932–1935;1946–1951;1973–2003)	01	00		00		01	1989	N/A	–
Urana-Cullivel (1952–1972)	06	06	1953, 1957, 1958, 1959, 1966, 1967	N/A	–	N/A	–	N/A	–

=== Senior Premierships: 1930–2007 ===
Coreen & District Football Association – 1909 to 1930.
Corowa & District Football Association – 1930 to 1935.
Coreen & District Football League – 1936 to 2007.

Year	Premiers	Score	Runners up	Score	Venue	Gate	Comments
1909	Ringwood		Burryjaa				Ringwood: Undefeated premiers
1910	Daysdale		Ringwood				
1911	Daysdale						Daysdale: Undefeated premiers
1912	Daysdale		Coreen Settlers				
1913	Coreen Settlers		Daysdale				
1914	Coreen Settlers		Daysdale				Coreen Settlers: Undefeated premiers
1915	Lowesdale Military		Daysdale				
1916-1918 – Recess due to WWI
1919	Coreen		Burryjaa		Daysdale		Burryjaa forfeited after refusing to play the grand final at Daysdale
1920	Corowa	8.5 – 53	Daysdale	5.3 – 33	Buraja		
1921	Balldale	7.9 – 51	Buraja	2.10 – 22	Coreen		
1922	Balldale	6.9 – 45	Buraja	6.7 – 43	Corowa		
1923	Balldale	10.5 – 65	Daysdale	3.5 – 23	Coreen		
1924	Buraja		Coreen				
1925	Ringwood	10.5 – 65	Coreen	5.14 – 44	Coreen		
1926	Coreen	11.10 – 76	Oaklands	5.5 – 35			
1927	Oaklands	4.9 – 33	Coreen	4.8 – 32	Daysdale		Coreen's protest against Oaklands' win on the grounds that the goal umpires' scorecards did not match was denied
1928	Oaklands	9.9 – 63	Coreen	7.5 – 47	Oaklands		
1929	Oaklands	6.9 – 45	Coreen	4.5 – 29	Urana		Daysdale's protest against Oaklands for playing an ineligible player in their semi-final was successful, requiring the semi-final and final to be replayed.
1929	Coreen	8.6 – 54	Oaklands	5.9 – 39	Urana		
1930	Coreen	8.19 – 67	Rand	8.10.58	Oaklands		No Challenge final required
1931							Coreen & DFA folds in May, 1931
Corowa & DFA name adopted
1930	Balldale	10.12 – 72	Brocklesby	8.8 – 56	Corowa	£53	First season of the Corowa & DFA
1931	Balldale	9.12 – 66	Coreen	6.13 – 49	Corowa	£22	
1932	Balldale	18.11 – 119	Daysdale	11.19 – 85	Corowa	£28	
1933	Coreen	13.12 – 90	Corowa Stars	10.17 – 77	Balldale		Umpire: Mitchell
1934	Balldale	12.15 – 87	Coreen	8.11 – 59	Oaklands		
1935	Oaklands	7.8 – 50	Rand	4.24 – 48	Daysdale		
Coreen & DFA name re-adopted
1936	Rand	7.10 – 52	Rennie	7.8 – 50	Oaklands	£26	
1937	Rand	11.12 – 78	Daysdale	5.7 – 37	Rennie	£28	Rand: Undefeated Premiers
1938	Rennie	10.11 – 71	Rand	4.11 – 35	Lowesdale	£40	
1939	Rennie	12.11 – 83	Mulwala	9.9 – 63	Daysdale		
1940	Rennie	11.9 – 75	Mulwala	5.7 – 37	Coreen		Umpired by C Fisher
1941-1945 – Recess due to WWII
1946	Coreen	11.4 – 70	Urana	8.7 – 55	Oaklands	£45	Umpired by C Fisher
1947	Coreen	13.9 – 87	Urana	12.12 – 84	Oaklands	£60	Umpired by Weather, Albury
1948	Wahgunyah	11.11 – 77	Coreen	8.15 – 63	Buraja	£94	
1949	Wahgunyah	6.14 – 50	South Corowa	6.10 – 46	Coreen		
1950	Hopefield Buraja	7.9 – 51	Coreen	4.10 – 34	Oaklands		
1951	Coreen	10.13 – 73	Hopefield Buraja	9.4 – 58	Rennie		
1952	Rennie	14.14 – 98	Coreen	12.7 – 79	Oaklands	£100	
1953	Urana-Cullivel	7.7 – 49	Oaklands	6.5 – 35	Coreen	£180	
1954	Rennie	9.16 – 70	Urana-Cullival	3.5 – 23	Buraja	£188	
1955	Rennie	10.5 – 65	Daysdale	8.9 – 57	Coreen	£144	
1956	Oaklands	10.8 – 68	Daysdale	9.11 – 65	Urana	£118	
1957	Urana-Cullivel	8.11 – 59	Daysdale	5.13 – 43	Coreen	£280	
1958	Urana-Cullivel	8.12 – 60	Rennie	8.10 – 58	Buraja	£316	
1959	Urana-Cullivel	12.11 – 83	Rennie	7.9 – 51	Coreen	£236	
1960	Hopefield-Buraja	11.13 – 79	Jerilderie	9.9 – 63	Daysdale	£320	
1961	Daysdale	8.22 – 70	Rennie	7.18 – 60	Lowesdale	£294	
1962	Daysdale	12.13 – 85	Coreen	8.9 – 57	Rennie	£182	Daysdale: Undefeated Premiers
1963	Jerilderie	7.13 – 55	Daysdale	4.9 – 34	Coreen	£240	
1964	Daysdale	10.8 – 68	Rennie	7.12 – 54	Coreen	£258	
1965	Blighty	14.12 – 96	Daysdale	13.16 – 94	Oaklands	£248	
1966	Urana-Cullival	13.8 86	Daysdale	12.13 – 85	Coreen	$585	Decimal currency:14/02/66
1967	Urana-Cullival	8.6 – 54	Oaklands	7.9 – 51	Rennie	$708	
1968	Wahgunyah	11.12 – 78	Oaklands	10.9 – 69	Buraja	$782	
1969	Rennie	12.8 – 80	Daysdale	11.4 – 70	Buraja	$646	
1970	Rennie	9.13 – 67	Oaklands	9.10 – 64	Daysdale	$590	
1971	Oaklands	16.13 – 109	Coreen	9.15 – 69	Rennie	$557	Oaklands: Undefeated Premiers
1972	Rennie	15.15 – 105	Hopefield Buraja	10.11 – 71	Coreen	$828	
1973	Hopefield Buraja	8.8 – 56	Coreen	3.8 – 26	Wahgunyah	$594	
1974	Coreen	18.14 – 122	Daysdale	12.19 – 91	Oaklands	$761	
1975	Coreen	13.11 – 89	Rennie	10.8 – 68	Urana	$1,028	
1976	Coleambally	13.4 – 82	Oaklands	9.13 – 67	Urana	$1,149	Gate charge:.80c
1977	Coleambally	10.16 – 76	Daysdale	10.13 – 73	Rennie	$1,349	
1978	Coreen	17.15 – 117	Wahgunyah	12.11 – 83	Rennie	$2,464	Gate charge:$1.50
1979	Coleambally	13.18 – 96	Hopefield Buraja	12.12 – 84	Coreen	$2270	
1980	Coreen	15.16 – 106	Rutherglen Corowa	13.9 – 87	Oaklands	$2,670	Gate charge:$2.00
1981	Oaklands	21.9 – 135	Hopefield Buraja	17.20 – 122	Coreen	$3,489	
1982	Hopefield Buraja	18.17 – 125	Wahgunyah	7.10 – 52	Rennie	$5,606	
1983	Rennie	26.24 – 180	Coreen	10.11 – 71	Buraja	$5,217	Rennie: Undefeated Premiers
1984	Rutherglen-Corowa	15.16 – 106	Rennie	6.8 – 44	Oaklands	$5,208	Gate charge:$3.00
1985	Rennie	17.20 – 122	Rutherglen-Corowa	12.8 – 80	Buraja	$5,956	
1986	Rutherglen-Corowa	12.6 – 78	Oaklands	8.11 – 59	Buraja	$5,400	Gate charge:$3.50
1987	Coreen	13.10 – 88	Rutherglen Corowa	12.11 – 83	Buraja	$5,721	
1988	Coleambally	18.14 – 122	Rutherglen Corowa	15.12 – 102	Buraja	$6,252	Gate charge:$4.00
1989	Oaklands	17.7 – 109	Coreen	11.24 – 90	Buraja	$8,050	Gate charge:$5.00
1990	Rutherglen Corowa	22.16 – 148	Oaklands	8.15 – 63	Buraja	$8,741	Coach: Dennis Walsh
1991	Coreen	16.18 – 114	Rutherglen Corowa	9.16 – 70	Buraja	$9,017	
1992	Rennie	10.9 – 69	Rand	6.9 – 45	Buraja	$10,460	Gate charge:$6.00
1993	Coleambally	19.11 – 125	Rand	11.7 – 73	Buraja	$9,952	
1994	Daysdale	16.7 – 103	Coleambally	10.8 – 68	Buraja	$11,700	
1995	Hopefield-Buraja	20.13 – 133	Jerilderie	9.4 – 58	Coreen	$11,100	
1996	Hopefield-Buraja	15.8 – 98	Jerilderie	10.6 – 68	Coreen	$9,445	
1997	Wahgunyah	9.10 – 64	Jerilderie	9.4 – 58	Buraja	$12,118	
1998	Wahgunyah	15.10 – 100	Jerilderie	8.11 – 59	Buraja	$10,999	
1999	Jerilderie		Wahgunyah		Rennie	$11,975	
2000	Jerilderie		Wahgunyah		Buraja	$12,497	Gate charge:$7.00
2001	Murray Magpies		Jerilderie		Rennie	$10,586	
2002	Wahgunyah	15.18 – 108	Coleambally	7.15 – 57	Buraja	$17,258	
2003	Jerilderie		Oaklands		Rennie	$18,978	
2004	Wahgunyah		Rennie		Jerilderie	$14,127	
2005	Coleambally		CDHBU		Rennie	$16,449	
2006	CDHBU		Coleambally		Rennie		
2007	CDHBU		Billabong Crows		Rennie		C&DFNL folded after 2007
Year	Premiers	Score	Runners Up	Score	Venue	Gate	Comments

- CDHBU: Coreen Daysdale Hopefield Buraja United

=== Reserves: 1976–2007 ===
- 1976: Oaklands
- 1977: Wahgunyah
- 1978: Wahgunyah
- 1979: Rutherglen-Corowa
- 1980: Rennie d Rutherglen-Corowa
- 1981: Hopefield-Buraja d Rutherglen-Corowa
- 1982: Rutherglen-Corowa d Hopefield Buraja
- 1983: Rennie d Wahgunyah
- 1984: Wahgunyah d Rutherglen-Corowa
- 1985: Rutherglen-Corowa d Wahgunyah
- 1986: Rutherglen-Corowa d Hopefield Buraja
- 1987: Rutherglen-Corowa d Coreen
- 1988: Rutherglen-Corowa d Wahgunyah
- 1989: Rennie d Rutherglen-Corowa
- 1990: Rennie d Rutherglen-Corowa
- 1991: Coreen d Rutherglen-Corowa
- 1992: Coreen d Wahgunyah
- 1993: Coreen d Wahgunyah
- 1994: Coreen d Rand
- 1995: Rennie d Coreen
- 1996: Rennie d Coleabally
- 1997: Wahgunyah
- 1998: Coleabally d Wahgunyah
- 1999: Wahgunyah
- 2000: Murray Magpies
- 2001: Murray Magpies d Coleabally
- 2002: Wahgunyah d CDHBU
- 2003: Coleabally d Murray Magpies
- 2004: Wahgunyah d Murray Magpies
- 2005: Coreen-Daysdale d Murray Magpies
- 2006: Coleabally d CDHBU
- 2007: Wahgunyah d Billabong Crows

=== Thirds / Under 16s: 1975–2007 ===
- 1975: Hopefield Buraaja c Oaklands
- 1976: Oaklands d Daysdale
- 1977: Hopefield Buraaja d Oaklands
- 1978: Wahgunyah d Oaklands
- 1979: Rutherglen-Corowa d Hopefield Buraaja
- 1980: Rutherglen-Corowa d Daysdale
- 1981: Rutherglen-Corowa d Wahgunyah
- 1982: Rutherglen-Corowa d Hopefield Buraja
- 1983: Rutherglen-Corowa d Rennie
- 1984: Rutherglen-Corowa d Rennie
- 1985: Rutherglen-Corowa d Rennie
- 1986: Rennie d Rutherglen-Corowa
- 1987: Wahgunyah d Rutherglen-Corowa
- 1988: Hopefield-Buraja d Rutherglen-Corowa
- 1989: Urana d Wahgunyah
- 1990: Rutherglen-Corowa d Oaklands
- 1991: Oaklands d Wahgunyah
- 1992: Oaklands d Hopefield Buraja
- 1993: Oaklands d Coleambally
- 1994: Jerilderie d Coleambally
- 1995: Coleambally d Rand
- 1996: Rand d Hopefield Buraja
- 1997: Jerilderie
- 1998: Wahgunyah d CDHBU
- 1999: Murray Magpies
- 2000: Murray Magpies
- 2001: Coleambally d Jerilderie
- 2002: Jerilderie d Wahgunyah
- 2003: Coreen-Daysdale d Jerilderie
- 2004: Jerilderie d CDHBU
- 2005: Jerilderie d CDHBU
- 2006: Jerilderie d Wahgunyah
- 2007: Wahgunyah d Jerilderie

=== Fourths / Under 13s: 2006–2007 ===
- 2006: Rennie d Coreen-Daysdale-Hopefield-Buraja United
- 2007: Coreen-Daysdale-Hopefield-Buraja United d Billabong Crows

== Senior Football Awards ==
Coreen & District Football League
Best & Fairest Award & Leading Goalkicker Awards
Senior Football

- Mr. F A Pearce of Corowa donated a best and fairest medal in 1930.
- In 1932, Mr. Fred Mason donated a gold medal for the best and fairest player, to be decided on by votes from the match umpires.
- The Kingston Cup was first awarded in 1938 and donated by Mr. Jack Kingston.
- Charles A. Wilson Medal (Wilson was a former Secretary of the Coreen & DFA & the medal donor)
- Archie Dennis Memorial Trophy / Medal. Archie Crawford Dennis was a former Rennie farmer, 1938 Rennie premiership player, Coreen & DFA representative player, Corowa footballer and former President (1946) and Vice President of the Coreen & DFA, who died tragically in a motor car accident in 1948, aged 36. He was a WW2 veteran too. The award was changed from a trophy to a medal in 1983.

Season	C&DFL Best & Fairest Award	Club	Votes	Leading Goalkicker	Football Club	Goals
	Corowa & DFA: Pearce Medal					
1930	Jack Anderson &	Balldale				
	W Hall	Howlong				
	Corowa & DFA: Mason Medal					
1932	No evidence of a winner					
1933	J Hickey	Daysdale				
	Kingston Cup					
1938	Tony Gelmi	Oaklands	22&1/2			
1939						
1940						
1941–45	In recess, WW2					
1946						
1947						
	Charles Wilson Medal					
1948	Ray Warford*	Hopefield	27	Bill Bryant Senior	Wahgunyah	87
1949	Jack Stakelum	Urana – Cullivel	16	R Lumby	Hopefield Buraja	58
1950	Dudley Smith	Oaklands		Jack Stakelum	Uran	29
	Archie Dennis Trophy					
1951	Ray "Joe" Quirk	Daysdale	25	W Chisnall	South Corowa	36
1952	Frank O'Leary	Rennie	21	I Gorman	Rennie	52
1953	Jim Sandral*	Rennie	19	I Gorman &	Rennie	22
				R Tait	Rennie	22
1954	Jim Sandral	Rennie	19	R Tait	Rennie	25
1955	Jim Hanrahan	Coreen	15	R Tait	Rennie	28
1956	Ian Gorman	Rennie	20	N White	Oaklands	33
1957	John Voss	Wahgunyah	22	N Elliott	Daysdale	47
1958	1st: Brian Cliff	Urana	19	F Kingston	Hopefield Buraja	35
	2nd: Max Maclean *	Wahgunyah	(19)			
1959	Brian Cliff	Urana	27	Urquhart	Urana	48
1960	Dave McFarlene	Daysdale	24	Bruce Ash	Hopefield-Buraja	60
1961	John Voss	Wahgunyah	27	J Burke	Jerilderie	56
1962	Brendan Carlin	Jerilderie	25	R Freyer	Wahgunyah	37
1963	Mick Dowdle	Jerilderie	20	Ken Lavis	Hopefield Buraja	47
1964	Leon Sandral	Oaklands	22	Ken Lavis	Hopefield Buraja	70
1965	John Voss	Wahgunyah	30	G Mills	Daysdale	54
1966	John Voss	Wahgunyah	18	Ken Lavis	Hopefield Buraja	44
1967	Peter Carroll	Coreen	19	George Maloney	Oaklands	58
1968	Peter Carroll	Coreen	30	George Maloney &	Oaklands	41
				L Good	Oaklands	41
1969	Peter Carroll	Coreen	18	G Nagle	Rennie	49
1970	Peter Carroll	Coreen	14	George Maloney	Oaklands	82
1971	Max Montgomery	Urana	21	George Maloney	Oaklands	80
1972	Barry Norman	Daysdale	20	George Maloney	Oaklands	51
1973	Colin Klose &	Oaklands	19	George Maloney	Oaklands	57
	Max Montgomery	Urana	19			
1974	Colin Klose	Oaklands	21	K Witherden	Coreen	69
1975	1st: William Nixon	Rennie	18	G Nagle	Rennie	63
	2nd: Len Chandler*	Wahgunyah	(18)			
1976	Len Chandler	Wahgunyah	23	A Dickens	Oaklands	60
1977	Len Johnstone	Wahgunyah	20	A Howe	Coleambally	95
1978	Jeff Hemphill	Boree Creek	31	Rod Lavis	Hopefield Buraja	60
1979	Anthony Howe	Coleambally	27	R Sargood	Coreen	81
1980	Neville Tait	Coreen	17	R Sargood	Coreen	77
1981	Len Johnstone	Wahgunyah	18	R Good	Oaklands	52
1982	Rod Lavis	Hopefield Buraja	18	1st: Rod Lavis	Hopefield Buraja	129
				2nd: R Sargood	Coreen	102
	Archie Denis Medal					
1983	Gavin Jones	Coreen	20	George Tobias	Rennie	123
1984	Tony Howe	Coleambally	23	Peter Tobias	Wahgunyah	121
1985	Michael Flanigan	Urana	31	1st: Peter Tobias &	Wahgunyah	164 (180)
				1st: P Lovell	Coleambally	164
				2nd: M Dalitz	Oaklands	107
1986	Terry Mardling	Daysdale	35	1st: P Lovell	Coleambally	134
				2nd: M Dalitz	Oaklands	117
1987	Michael Flanigan	Urana	22	Rod Lavis	Hopefield Buraja	88
1988	Gary Toscan	Coleambally	26	Rod Lavis	Hopefield Buraja	72
1989	Wayne Milthorpe	Wahgunyah	23	Rod Lavis	Hopefield Buraja	101
1990	Patrick Beattie	Oaklands	20	Richard Flanigan	Uran	76
1991	Anthony Carroll	Coreen	25	Mark Smith	Coreen	123
1992	Anthony Ferguson	Rennie	23	Ned Nagle	Rennie	66
1993	Brett Harrison	Rand	20	Rob Harrington	Coleambally	68
1994	Ian Bock	Daysdale	24	Ron Hughes	Hopefield Buraja	77
1995	Robert Burgess	Urana	25	Brian Payne	Jerilderie	77
1996	Mat Hanlon	Jerilderie	19	Travis Collier	Jerilderie	68
1997	Bruce Hill	Coreen Daysdale	28	Ray Robbins	Wahgunyah	110
1998	Tyson Maloney	Oaklands	26	Ray Robbins	Wahgunyah	82
1999	Tyson Maloney	Oaklands	33	Ray Robbins	Wahgunyah	115
2000	Aaron Purcell	Jerilderie	26	Ray Robbins	Wahgunyah	139
2001	Adam Williams	Jerilderie	25	Brendan Cornell	CDHBU	116
2002	Scott Parker	Wahgunyah	22	Ray Robbins	Wahgunyah	132
2003	Tyson Maloney	Oaklands	27	Andrew Harvey	Rand	78
2004	Aaron Purcell	Jerilderie	28	Daniel Casset	Rennie	113
2005	Xavier Mardling	CDHBU	32	Doug Lavis	CDHBU	136
2006	Martin Hardy	Rennie	17	Doug Lavis	CDHBU	106
2007	Tyson Maloney	Billabong Crows	26	Ray Robbins	Wahgunyah	85

- 1958 - Max Maclean - (Wahgunyah) tied with the winner on votes but finished as runner up under the old countback system.
- 1975 - Len Chandler - (Wahgunyah) tied with the winner on votes but finished as runner up under the old countback system.
- Oldest winner: 1966: John Voss, Wahgunyah, 37 years old.
- Youngest winner: 1963: Mick Dowdle, Jerilderie, 16 years old.
- Four x Archie Denis Medal wins: John Voss, Wahgunyah; Peter Carroll, Coreen and Tyson Maloney, Oaklands & Billabong Crows.
- John Voss also won two Chiltern & District Football Association best and fairest awards (Huggins Medal) in 1955 and 1956, representing Wahgunyah Football Club.
- Ray Warford also won three Ovens & King Football League best and fairest awards in 1953, 1955 and 1956 with Moyhu FC. Warford also played in Granya's 1946 Tallangatta & District Football League's premiership and played with South Melbourne Football Club Reserves in 1949. He then played in Wangaratta's 1950 Ovens & Murray Football League premiership.
- Jim Sandral also won three Ovens & Murray Football League best and fairest awards in 1959, 1962 and 1964 with Corowa. Sandral was also runner up in Archie Denis Medal in 1966, 67, 68, 69 and 1970. 1956 – Melbourne Football Club VFL premiership player.

Season	C&DFL Best & Fairest Media Award	Club	Votes
	Allan Dotchin Jewellers Award		
1981	Dominic Carroll	Coreen	17
1982	Terry O'Hallaran	Rand	26
1983	Robert Tait	Rennie	20
1984	Tony Howe	Coleambally	33
1985	Terry Mardling	Daysdale	32
1986	Terry Mardling	Daysdale	35
1987	Keith Smith	Coleambally	29
	Arcade Jewellers Award		
1988	Peter Rippingdale	Daysdale	25
1989	Winston Rhodes	Rennie	26
1990	Ian Bock	Daysdale	22
1991	Steven Grantham &	Wahgunyah	24
	Russell Maloney	Oaklands	24
1992	W "Bill" Coghill	Urana	19
1993	John Coghill	Urana	25
1994	Gary Davie	Wahgunyah	28
1995	Mathew Brockley *	Daysdale	24
1996	Craig Bryon	Hopefield Buraja	27
1997	Glen Eddie	Jerilderie	26
1998	Craig Bryon	Hopefield Buraja	41
1999	Geoff McCallum	Jerilderie	34
2000	Steven Byrnes	Hopefield Buraja	37
2001	Adam Williams	Jerilderie	39
2002	Ben Kerr	Oaklands	31
2003	Adam Williams	Jerilderie	40
2004	Aaron Purcell	Jerilderie	41
2005	Andrew McGown	Coleambally	45
2006	Lucas Mellier	Murray Magpies	33
2007	Joshua Lewis	Rennie	20

- 1995 – Won on a countback from Robbie Burgess – Urana & C Williams – Oaklands.

Most goals in a senior C&DFL match

- 24 – Peter Lovell – 1985 – Coleambally v Rand
- 22 – Peter Tobias – 1985 – Wahgunyah v Hopefield Buraja
- 20 – Johnathan Creenaune – 2004 – Coreen Daysdale Hopefield Buraja United v Urana

Most goals in a finals series

- Elimination Final:
- Qualifying Final:
- First Semi Final: 11 – B Hill v Rand, 1994
- Second Semi Final: 10 – Phil Azzi, Brocklesby v Corowa Stars, 1930 & 10 – Rod Lavis, Hopefield Buraja v Oaklands, 1982
- Preliminary Final: 11 – D Quirk, Coreen v Urana, 1952
- Grand Final: 10 – George Tobias, Rennie v Coreen, 1983

== Reserves Football Awards ==
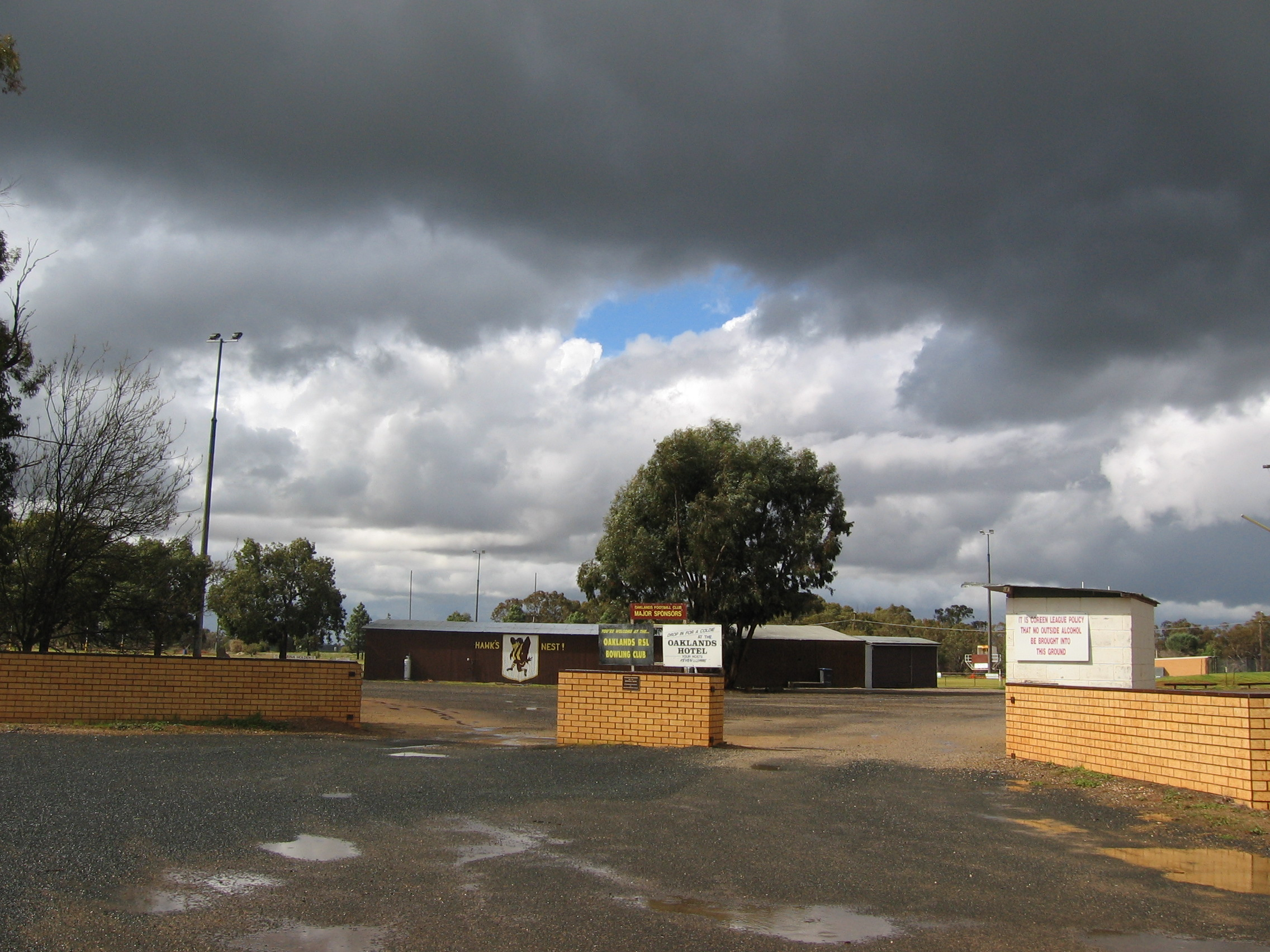
Oaklands Football Ground Entrance

This Coreen & DFL Reserves competition commenced in 1980.

Season	C&DFL RESERVES Best & Fairest Award	Club	Votes	Leading Goalkicker	Football Club	Goals
1980	A Holmequest	Rennie		G Woods	Rennie	28
1981	G Woods	Rennie		G Klose	Oaklands	31
1982	R Nagle	Rennie		R Pearce	Corowa Rutherglen	39
1983	R Hiskins	Hopefield Buraja		I Lee &	Corowa Rutherglen	37
	Dave H Lewis Trophy			G Filliponi	Hopefield Buraja	37
1984	T Cope	Wahgunyah		G Wheeler	Rennie	51
1985	Mick Whelan	Hopefield Buraja	19	A Dickins	Ocklands	43
1986	Chris Killeen	Corowa Rutherglen	26	Mick Whelan	Hopefield Buraja	69
1987	Chris Killeen	Corowa Rutherglen	25			
1988	M Dunbar	Coleambally	23	Sid Bedford	Coreen	51
1989	Mick Upton	Wahgunyah	21	Sid Bedford	Coreen	82
1990	G Talbot	Coreen	22	Phil Martin &	Rennie	70
				Sid Bedford	Coreen	70
1991	A Morris	Corowa Rutherglen	21	David McCulloch	Rand	49
1992	J Carroll	Coreen	18	Sid Bedford	Coreen	61
1993	Noel Richies	Rennie	18	James Suidgeest	Oaklands	55
1994	Noel Richies	Rennie	28	John Dempsey	Rand	60
1995	Noel Richies	Rennie	26	Marqus O'Dwyer	Rennie	70
1996	Marqus O'Dwyer	Rennie		Marqus O'Dwyer	Rennie	61
1997	K Collier	Jerilderie	25	Mark Baldwin	Jerilderie	70
1998	D McGowan	Coleambally	23	Ian Rogers	Wahgunyah	57
1999	Darren McGowan	Coleambally	24	Mark Morey	Murray Magpies	102
2000	C Scott	CDHBU	21	Barry Mannes	Coleambaly	100
2001	R Dolan	Urana	21	Ray Robbins	Wahgunyah	73
2002	Warwick Henderson	Rennie	31	Dean Pound	Coleambally	64
2003	Carson Thomas	Jerilderie	21	Brad Lewis	Rennie	74
2004	Danny Dinan	CDHBU	15	John Walker	Rennie	57
2005	Darren Harvey	Wahgunyah	30	Matthew Marshall	Murray Magpies	76
2006	Trevor Eldridge	Jerilderie	22	Adrian Grantham	Wahgunyah	55
2007	Wayne Coster	Coleambally	21	David Copolino	Wahgunyah	50

== Thirds Football Awards ==
This Coreen & DFL Thirds (Under16's) football competition commenced in 1975.

Season	C&DFL THIRDS Best & Fairest Award	Club	Votes	Leading Goalkicker	Football Club	Goals
1975	J Robinson	Rennie	11			
1976	John Clohessy	Coreen	21			
1977	G Growden	Coleambally	26			
1978	Graham Smith	Oaklands	25	R Grantham	Wahgunyah	78
1979	R Smith	Oaklands	22	R Good	Oaklands	76
1980	R Eyers	Wahgunyah	20	M Morely	Corowa/Rutherglen	47
1981	Geoff Smith	Oaklands	27	Adrian Grantham	Wahgunyah	83
1982	Paul Davidson	Corowa/Rutherglen	19	Rod Gulliver	Wahgunyah	56
1983	R Burgess	Rennie	18	S Palmer	Wahgunyah	77
1984	N Holten	Corowa/Rutherglen	13	John Longmire	Corowa/Rutherglen	58
1985	Paul Weir	Corowa/Rutherglen	11	C Walliss	Coreen	25
1986	M Banch	Rennie	13	R Lovell	Coleambally	35
1987	Cory Edmonstone	Corowa/Rutherglen	17	Ray Robbins	Corowa/Rutherglen	29
1988	Wayne Johnstone	Wahgunyah	22	D McLachlan	Wahgunyah	103
1989	1st: Andrew Driscoll	Urana	20	Damian Houlihan	Wahgunyah	41
	2nd: Damian Houlihan	Wahgunyah	16			
1990	Danny Shiers *	Corowa/Rutherglen	20	Anthony Freyer	Wahgunyah	42
	Bradley Roach: 2nd	Wahgunyah	(20)			
1991	P Roksandic	Wahgunyah	19	Adam Houlihan	Wahgunyah	68
1992	Sean Clarke	Coleambally	25	Adam McNamara	Rennie	47
1993	Grant Jolly	Wahgunyah	22	D Lavis	Hopefield Buraja	60
1994	Daryl Robinson	Rand	29	D Lavis	Hopefield Buraja	133
1995	Daryl Robinson	Rand	28			
1996	Andrew McGowan	Coleambally		B Matthews	Rand	42
1997	Rhett Matthews	Rand	25	S Jones	Jerilderie	113
1998	D McCormack &	Jerilderie	21			
	J Woods	Rennie	21			
1999	Lachlan McGregor	Jerilderie	44			
2000	Bryden McLeod	Coleambally	32			
2001	David Dunbar	Coleambally	26			
2002	Lee Schmidt	Hopefield Buraja	21			
2003	Scott Brunnemeyer	Wahgunyah	33			
2004	Taylor Duryea &	Wahgunyah	14			
	Brody O'Brien	Jerilderie	14			
2005	Taylor Duryea	Wahgunyah	20			
2006	Brody A'Vard	Jerilderie	31			
2007	Jack Williams	Jerilderie	23			

- 1990 – Danny Shiers won on a countback from Bradley Roach.
- Between 1993 and 2007, the Thirds goalkicking totals were not published in the Coreen & DFA grand final record.

== 2005 Ladder ==
Coreen DFL	Wins	Byes	Losses	Draws	For	Against	%	Pts
Coreen-Daysdale	17	0	1	0	2850	1178	241.94%	68
Coleambally	14	0	4	0	2338	1404	166.52%	56
Murray Magpies	13	0	5	0	2129	1438	148.05%	52
Rennie	9	0	9	0	1754	1942	90.32%	36
Wahgunyah	7	0	11	0	1651	1882	87.73%	28
Rand	6	0	12	0	1586	2417	65.62%	24
Billabong Crows	5	0	13	0	1381	2014	68.57%	20
Jerilderie	1	0	17	0	970	2384	40.69%	4

FINALS

Final	Team	G	B	Pts	Team	G	B	Pts
1st Semi	Rennie	5	14	44	Murray Magpies	3	7	25
2nd Semi	Coreen-Daysdale	21	11	137	Coleambally	14	5	89
Preliminary	Coleambally	16	11	107	Rennie	11	13	79
Grand	Coleambally	16	10	106	Coreen-Daysdale	13	16	94

== 2006 Ladder ==
Coreen DFL	Wins	Byes	Losses	Draws	For	Against	%	Pts
CDHBU	16	3	2	0	2463	1090	225.96%	76
Coleambally	15	3	3	0	2132	1231	173.19%	72
Wahgunyah	11	3	7	0	2119	1344	157.66%	56
Rennie	10	3	8	0	1850	1739	106.38%	52
Murray Magpies	8	3	10	0	1547	1905	81.21%	44
Billabong Crows	2	3	16	0	832	2345	35.48%	20
Jerilderie	1	3	17	0	911	2200	41.41%	16

FINALS

Final	Team	G	B	Pts	Team	G	B	Pts
1st Semi	Rennie	17	13	115	Wahgunyah	15	6	96
2nd Semi	CDHBU	6	17	53	Coleambally	12	14	86
Preliminary	CDHBU	16	16	112	Rennie	9	15	69
Grand	CDHBU	21	17	143	Coleambally	9	8	62

== 2007: 99th & Final Season ==
Ladder: Seniors		Wins	Draws	Losses	Byes	For	Against	%	Pts
1	Billabong Crows	11	0	4	0	1572	1204	130.56%	44
2	C.D.H.B.U. (P)	10	0	5	0	1632	1137	143.54%	40
3	Coleambally	10	0	5	0	1475	1295	113.90%	40
4	Wahgunyah	8	0	7	0	1654	1232	134.25%	32
5	Jerilderie	6	0	9	0	1465	1353	108.28%	24
6	Rennie	0	0	15	0	736	2313	31.82%	0

Finals: Seniors		Team	G	B	Pts	Team	G	B	Pts
A	1st Semi; Rennie Recreation Ground	Coleambally	9	7	61	Wahgunyah	7	13	55
B	2nd Semi; Monash Park, Jeilderie	Billabong Crows	11	11	77	C.D.H.B.U.	17	10	112
C	Preliminary; Rennie Recreation Ground	Billabong Crows	19	14	128	Coleambally	9	13	67
D	Grand; Rennie Recreation Ground	C.D.B.H.U.	24	19	163	Billabong Crows	8	2	50

Ladder: Reserves		Wins	Draws	Losses	Byes	For	Against	%	Pts
1	Wahgunyah (P)	14	0	1	0	1526	439	347.61%	56
2	C.D.H.B.U.	11	0	4	0	1385	559	247.76%	44
3	Billabong Crows	8	0	7	0	1067	840	127.02%	32
4	Jerilderie	7	0	8	0	854	945	90.37%	28
5	Coleambally	4	0	11	0	640	1136	56.34%	16
6	Rennie	1	0	14	0	302	1855	16.28%	0

Finals: Reserves		Team	G	B	Pts	Team	G	B	Pts
A	1st Semi; Rennie Recreation Ground	Billabong Crows	10	12	72	Jerilderie	6	11	47
B	2nd Semi; Monash Park, Jeilderie	Wahgunyah	9	12	66	C.D.H.B.U.	8	6	54
C	Preliminary; Rennie Recreation Ground	C.D.H.B.U.	10	4	64	Billabong Crows	11	11	77
D	Grand; Rennie Recreation Ground	Wahgunyah	12	8	80	Billabong Crows	8	5	53

Ladder: Thirds		Wins	Draws	Losses	Byes	For	Against	%	Pts
1	Wahgunyah (P)	15	0	0	0	1744	214	814.95%	60
2	Jerilderie	11	0	4	0	1215	462	262.99%	44
3	C.D.B.H.U.	9	0	6	0	715	904	79.09%	36
4	Rennie	6	0	9	0	683	980	69.69%	24
5	Coleambally	3	0	12	0	569	1279	44.49%	12
6	Billabong Crows	1	0	14	0	274	1361	20.13%	4

Finals: Thirds		Team	G	B	Pts	Team	G	B	Pts
A	1st Semi; Rennie Recreation Ground	C.D.H.B.U.	4	7	31	Rennie	9	8	62
B	2nd Semi; Monash Park, Jeilderie	Wahgunyah	10	20	80	Jerilderie	1	2	8
C	Preliminary; Rennie Recreation Ground	Jerilderie	07	10	52	Rennie	7	7	49
D	Grand; Rennie Recreation Ground	Wahgunyah	16	12	103	Jerilderie	0	0	0

Ladder: Fourths		Wins	Draws	Losses	Byes	For	Against	%	Pts
1	C.D.B.H.U. (P)	15	0	0	0	1240	148	837.84%	60
2	Billabong Crows	12	0	3	0	417	347	120.17%	48
3	Rennie	6	0	9	0	360	547	65.81%	24
4	Coleambally	5	0	10	0	299	551	54.26%	20
5	Jerillderie	4	0	11	0	287	622	46.14%	16
6	Wahgunyah	3	0	12	0	293	618	43.02%	12

Finals: Fourths		Team	G	B	Pts	Team	G	B	Pts
A	1st Semi; Rennie Recreation Ground	Rennie	9	6	60	Coleambally	4	5	29
B	2nd Semi; Monash Park, Jeilderie	C.D.H.B.U.	6	12	48	Billabong Crows	1	0	6
C	Preliminary; Rennie Recreation Ground	Billabong Crows	7	3	45	Rennie	5	4	34
D	Grand; Rennie Recreation Ground	C.D.H.B.U.	10	6	66	Billabong Crows	3	1	19

== Coreen & DFL – Office Bearers ==
Season	President	Secretary	Treasurer
1909	T Forge	L Hogg	?
1910	T H Thomas	S R E Loveridge	
1911	Oscar Kuschert	S R E Loveridge	
1912	Oscar Kuschert	R Pearson	
1913	Oscar Kuschert	Fred Bush	Fred Bush
1914	Oscar Kuschert	Fred Bush	Fred Bush
1915	A T Watson	Fred Bush	Fred Bush
1916–18	In recess. WWI	Fred Bush	Fred Bush
1919	J Kingston	Fred Bush	Fred Bush
1920	J Kingston	S Filliponi	
1921	J Kingston	E J Gillian	
1922	J Anderson	E J Gillian	
1923	J Kingston	E J Gillian	
1924	C W Thompson	J B Abbott	
1925–26	B Hall	D J Dwyer	
1927	C W Thompson	D J Dwyer	
1928	F A Gould	S Kelly	
1929–30	J J Warren	S Kelly	
	Corowa & DFA		
1930–31	Cr. J H Willis	R P Hunt	R P Hunt
1932	R M Bayfield	R P Hunt	
1933	Ran Wilson	R P Hunt	
1934	J J Warren		
1935	W J Thomas	B Miller	
	Coreen & DFA		
1936–37	W J Thomas	B Miller	
1938	G Cooper	Charles Wilson	
1939	J T McKenzie	Charles Wilson	
1940–45	R Brown	Charles Wilson	
1946	Archie Dennis	Charles Wilson	
1947–48	Alec Caughey	Charles Wilson	
1949	A Caughey	J Callaghan	
1950–51	A Caughey	A Cleaves	
1952	Paul Zanoni	G Hayter	
1953–69	P Zanoni	A Caughey	A Caughey
1970–71	P Zanoni	H A Caughey	H A Caughey
1972–76	David Lewis	R J McKellar	R J McKellar
1977–87	D Lewis	Lindsay K Norman	L K Norman
1988-05	Peter P Carroll	L K Norman	L K Norman
2006–07	P Price	L K Norman	L K Norman

== Life Members ==
- Paul Zanoni
- Alec Caughey
- Dave Lewis
- Lindsay K Norman
- Noreen Norman
- Peter P Carroll
- Claude Tomlinson

== See also ==
- AFL NSW/ACT
- Australian rules football in New South Wales
