= Peter Stephens (footballer, born 1950) =

Australian rules footballer

Personal information
- Full name: Peter N. Stephens
- Born: 21 June 1950 (age 76)
- Original team: Jerildeire
- Height: 193 cm (6 ft 4 in)
- Weight: 82 kg (181 lb)

Playing career^{1}
Years	Club	Games (Goals)
1971–1973	Geelong	35 (28)
- ^{1} Playing statistics correct to the end of 1973.

Peter Stephens (born 21 June 1950) is a former Australian rules footballer who played with Geelong in the Victorian Football League (VFL).

Stephens, who was recruited from New South Wales, was a ruckman, also used as a forward during his three seasons at Geelong.

He captained Geelong West to a 28-point grand final win over Dandenong in 1975, the club's sole VFA first-division premiership.
