= Graham Cooper (Australian rules footballer) =

Australian rules footballer (1938–2019)

Personal information
- Full name: Graham Stanley Cooper
- Born: 24 April 1938
- Died: 11 December 2019 (aged 81)
- Original team: Hampton Scouts
- Height: 188 cm (6 ft 2 in)
- Weight: 85 kg (187 lb)

Playing career^{1}
Years	Club	Games (Goals)
1959–1965	Hawthorn	90 (6)
- ^{1} Playing statistics correct to the end of 1965.

Career highlights
- VFL premiership player: 1961

Graham Cooper (24 April 1938 – 11 December 2019) was an Australian rules footballer who played for Hawthorn in the Victorian Football League (VFL) during the early 1960s.

Usually seen in the back pocket, Cooper was a member of Hawthorn's inaugural premiership side in the 1961 VFL Grand Final. He also played on the losing side in the 1963 VFL Grand Final. His last game for Hawthorn was against the Ron Barassi led Carlton in the opening round of 1965.

He left Hawthorn to take up a coaching position with Jerilderie in New South Wales. By 1969 he was back in Melbourne as he was coach of Oakleigh in the VFA from 1969 to 1970.

He was the older brother of St Kilda player, Ian Cooper.
