= Jerilderie Football Club =

Jerilderie

Names
- Full name: Jerilderie Football Netball Club
- Nickname(s): Demons
- Club song: 'Grand old flag'

Club details
- Founded: 1891; 134 years ago
- Colours
- Competition: Picola & District FNL
- President: Dean Knight
- Ground(s): Jerilderie Football Ground

Uniforms
Home

The Jerilderie Football Netball Club is an Australian rules football and netball club based in Jerilderie, a town in the Riverina region of New South Wales.

The club teams currently compete in the Picola & District FNL, which Jerilderie FNC joined in 2008 following the dissolution of the Coreen & District Football League in 2007 after 99 years of existence.

== History ==
The first recorded match that Jerilderie FC played in was against the Berrigan FC in Jerilderie August, 1891, which resulted in a draw. After the game the Jerilderie hosted Berrigan at White's Courthouse Hotel.

In 1928, the Jerilderie Juveniles: 11.14 – 80 defeated Tocumwal: 2.7 – 19 to retain the Resch's Cup.

The club won three Murray Football League premierships in 1983, 1987 and 1989.

The club won three premierships in the Coreen & District Football League in 1999, 2000, 2003.

They won the Picola & District Football League Preimership in 2009, 2012, 2013 and 2014 in the North West Division

== Premierships ==
Seniors

- Southern Riverina Football Association (1905–1931)
  - Nil
- Murray Valley Second Eighteen Football Association 2nd XVIII (1932–1956)
  - 1933, 1934, 1937, 1938, 1951,
- Coreen & District Football League (1957–1963)
  - 1963
- Murray Football League (1964–1993)
  - 1983, 1987, 1989
- Coreen & District Football League (1994–2007)
  - 1999, 2000, 2003
- Picola & District Football League (NW) (2008–present)
  - 2009, 2012, 2013, 2014

Reserves

?

Thirds

?

Fourths

?

== VFL / AFL Players ==
Former Jerilderie players who went onto play VFL / AFL include –

- 1964 – Mick Dowdle – North Melbourne
- 1971 – Peter Stephens – Geelong
- 1986 – Billy Brownless – Geelong

Several former VFL/AFL players have coached Jerilderie FC that include –

- Graham Cooper – Hawthorn. Coached Jerilderie in 1966.
- Russell Jeffrey – St. Kilda & Brisbane Bears.
