= Southern Riverina Football Association =

The Southern Riverina Football Association was first established in 1905 for towns in the Southern Riverina area of New South Wales, near the Murray River, which evolved into a strong and vibrant Australian rules football competition for the next 27 years.

== History ==
The Southern Riverina Football Association (SRFA) was first established in 1905. for towns in the Southern Riverina area, near the Murray River, New South Wales to initially play a series of friendly matches. The competition evolved over the next few years and it went onto become a strong and vibrant football competition up until 1931.

In 1907, the SRFA consisted of five teams, Berrigan, Finley, Jerilderie, Leniston and Trefoil Park.

In 1908, Trefoil Park dropped out of the SRFA competition, leaving just four teams.

In 1912, Berrigan, Finley and Tocumwal attended the Annual General Meeting and as Finley agreed to field two teams, the association was reformed. But shortly afterwards, Tocumwal joined the Goulburn Valley Football Association and thus the association went into recess for the 1912 season.

In 1917, the SRFA consisted of the following four teams – Berrigan, Finley, Jerilderie "Diehards" and the Mairjimmy "Hayseeds".

Tocumwal played in seven consecutive Southern Riverina Football Association grand finals between 1922 and 1928, but unfortunately they only won the last won in 1928.

In 1928, six teams made up the SRFA – Berrigan, Corree, Finley, Jerilderie, Lalalty and Tocumwal.

In 1931, the SRFA senior football competition was abandoned late in the season, due to a very wet winter, with many matches postponed due to the poor road conditions in the area.

The demise of the SRFA came about when both Berrigan and Finley applied to join the Murray Football League (MFL) in 1932, but the two teams were rejected on the grounds of excessive travel for the Victorian-based clubs.

This left Berrigan and Finley without a senior football competition in 1932 as both clubs did not want to travel to Oaklands and Urana to compete. Berrigan and Finley both entered a team in the SRFA junior competition in 1932. Both clubs, along with Nathalia were finally admitted into the MFL in 1933.

== Clubs ==
=== Final ===
Club	Colours	Nickname	Home Ground	Former League	Est.	Years in SRFA	SRFA Senior Premierships		Fate
Club	Colours	Nickname	Home Ground	Former League	Est.	Years in SRFA	Total	Years	Fate
Berrigan		Saints	Berrigan Recreation Reserve, Berrigan	MBFA	1891	1904-1911, 1913-1931	10	1906, 1909, 1913, 1916, 1917, 1919, 1920, 1921, 1924, 1925	Unaffiliated in 1911. Recess in 1932, re-formed in Murray FL in 1933
Finley		Cats	Finley Recreation Reserve, Finley, New South Wales	FDFA	c.1890s	1904-1911, 1913-1931	8	1910, 1914, 1922, 1923, 1926, 1927, 1929, 1930	Unaffiliated in 1911. Recess in 1932, re-formed in Murray FL in 1933
Jerilderie		Diehards, Demons	Jerilderie Recreation Reserve, Jerilderie	–	1891	1904-1905, 1907-1911, 1913-1914, 1919-1931	0	-	Recess in 1906 and 1916-19. Unaffiliated in 1911. Moved to Murray Valley Second XVIII FL in 1932
Oaklands		Hawks	Oaklands Recreation Ground, Oaklands	C&DFA	1899	1931	0	-	Returned to Coreen & District FA in 1932
Urana		Spiders, Bombers	Urana Recreation Ground, Urana	C&DFA	1920s	1931	0	-	Returned to Coreen & District FA in 1932

=== Former ===
Club	Colours	Nickname	Home Ground	Former League	Est.	Years in SRFA	SRFA Senior Premierships		Fate
Club	Colours	Nickname	Home Ground	Former League	Est.	Years in SRFA	Total	Years	Fate
Barooga		Hawks	Barooga Recreation Reserve, Barooga, New South Wales	GVFA	1894	1929-1930	0	-	Formed Murray FL in 1931
Coree				–	1916	1916-1921, 1923-1930	0	-	Recess in 1922. Folded after 1930 season
Lalalty			Berrigan Recreation Reserve, Berrigan	–	1921	1921-1929	0	-	Folded after 1907 season
Leniston				–	1906	1906-1909	1	1908	Folded after 1909 season
Mairjimmy		Hayseeds		–	1917	1917	0	-	Folded after 1917 season
Savernake (Savernake-Warmatta 1909-10)			Savernake Recreation Reserve, Savernake	CHFA, FFA, CDFA		1904, 1909-1910, 1929	0	-	Played in Federal FA between 1905-08. Moved to Coreen & District FA in 1911 and returned there in 1930
Tocumwal		Bloods	Tocumwal Recreation Reserve, Tocumwal	GVFA	1891	1910-1911, 1913-1914, 1916, 1918-1930	2	1911, 1928	Returned to Goulburn Valley FA in 1912 and 1920 Formed Murray FL in 1931
Trefoil Park				–	1906	1906-1907	0	-	Folded after 1907 season

== SRFA – Grand Finals / Premiers ==
Year	Premiers	Score	Runners-up	Score	Ref/comments
1904	?				
1905	?				
1906	Berrigan	---	Finley	---	Berrigan declared champions as minor premiers.
1907	Finley	---	Jerilderie	---	Finley declared champions as minor premiers.
1908	Leniston	1.6 (12)	Berrigan	0.6 (6)	
1909	Berrigan	4.4 (28)	Finley	1.4 (10)	
1910	Finley	3.7 (25)	Berrigan	0.3 (3)	
1911	Tocumwal	3.10 (28)	Berrigan	1.6 (12)	Tocumwal lost the final to Berrigan, however as minor premiers were allowed to challenge Berrigan again.
1912	Competition in recess				
1913	Berrigan	5.3 (33)	Finley	2.11 (23)	
1914	Finley	9.11 (65)	Tocumwal	2.3 (15)	
1915	Competition likely in recess due to World War I.				
1916	Berrigan	3.8 (26)	Tocumwal	1.1 (7)	
1917	Berrigan	?	?	?	Final unknown if played.
1918	Finley	---	Berrigan	---	Finley lost the final to Berrigan, however as minor premiers were allowed to challenge Berrigan again. Berrigan originally defeated Finley by eight points in the challenge final, but Finley successfully protested the result.
1919	Berrigan	6.11 (47)	Finley	2.4 (16)	
1920	Berrigan	4.11 (35)	Finley	2.5 (17)	
1921	Berrigan	5.9 (39)	Jerilderie	5.7 (37)	
1922	Finley	5.14 (44)	Tocumwal	2.5 (17)	
1923	Finley	5.4 (34)	Tocumwal	4.8 (32)	
1924	Berrigan	3.4 (22)	Tocumwal	2.8 (20)	
1925	Berrigan	11.17 (83)	Tocumwal	7.4 (46)	
1926	Finley	10.8 (68)	Tocumwal	5.2 (32)	
1927	Finley	11.9 (75)	Tocumwal	4.10 (34)	
1928	Tocumwal	8.17 (65)	Finley	6.6 (42)	
1929	Finley	11.16 (82)	Coree	11.15 (81)	
1930	Finley	12.11 (83)	Berrigan	10.14 (74)	
1931	Season abandoned due to wet weather and poor road conditions.				

== Southern Riverina Junior Football Association ==
A Southern Riverina Junior Football Association was established in 1930 and the grand final scores are listed below.

- 1930 – Berrigan: 6.9 – 45 defeated Tocumwal: 5.9 – 39.
- 1931 – Berrigan: 7.8 – 50 defeated Tocumwal: 6.10 – 46.
- 1932 – Tocumwal: 5.9 – 39 defeated Berrigan: 3.13 – 31.

In May 1933, at the Annual General Meeting of the SRJFA, it was decided to change the name of the competition to the Murray River Second Eighteen Football Association, with Cobram being admitted to play against – Berrigan, Finley, Jerilderie and Tocumwal.

- 1933 – Jerilderie: 7.11 – 53 defeated Cobram: 8.3 – 51.
- 1934 – Jerilderie: 9.15 – 69 defeated Tocumwal: 5.5 – 35.
- 1935 – Cobram: 6.5 – 35 defeated Berrigan: 4.4 – 28.
- 1936 – Cobram / Barooga United: 9.7 – 61 defeated Jerilderie: 7.3 – 45.
- 1937 – Jerilderie: 9.11 – 65 defeated Barooga: 6.3 – 39.
- 1938 – Jerilderie: 12.12 – 84 defeated Berrigan: 7.7 – 49.
- 1939 – Berrigan: 11.14 – 80 defeated Tocumwal: 8.12 – 60.
- 1940 – The 1940 season commenced, but it was most likely abandoned later in the season due to World War II.
- 1941 to 1944: In recess due to World War II.

In 1945, the Southern Riverina Junior Football Association was re-established. The grand final results are listed below –

- 1945 – Tocumwal: 12.7 – 79 defeated Berrigan: 11.11 – 77.

In 1946, the Jerilderie Herald and Urana Advertiser was writing this competition up as the – Murray Valley Second Eighteen Football Association. Grand Finals scores were –

- 1946 – Tocumwal: 9.13 – 67 defeated Jerilderie: 4.10 – 34
- 1947 – Berrigan: 9.11 – 54 defeated Finley: 6.9 – 45.
- 1948 – Berrigan: 12.15 – 87 defeated Jerilderie: 12.10 – 82.
- 1949 – Finley: 8.12 – 60 defeated Barooga: 6.12 – 48.
- 1950 – Barooga: 9.7 – 61 drew with Finley: 8.13 – 61.
- 1950 – Barooga: 8.11 – 59 defeated Finley: 6.2 – 38. Grand Final replay.
- 1951 – Jerilderie: 9.8 – 62 defeated Barooga: 8.9 – 57.
- 1952 – Barooga: 8.14 – 62 defeated Yarrawonga: 8.7 – 55.
- 1953 – Barooga: 10.18 – 78 defeated Yarrawonga: 6.7 – 43.
- 1954 – Denilquin: 17.11 – 113 defeated Jerilderie: 4.8 – 32.
- 1955 – Yarrawonga defeated Barooga?, at Tocumwal.
- 1956 – Barooga defeated Denilquin by 9 points. At Tocumwal.

== Best and Fairest ==
Murray Valley Second Eighteen Football Association

- 1951: Max Mason – Jerilderie &
  M Toohey – Barooga (25)
- 1952: Vin Toohey - Barooga (?)
- 1953 - Vin Toohey - Barooga (?)
- 1954: Gerald O'Dwyer - Barooga
- 1955: G O'Dwyer - Barooga
- 1956: Don Hyde - Deniliquin
- 1957: Jim Cullen – Barooga (24)
- 1958: Vin Toohey - Barooga (24)
