= Duncan McIvor =

Australian rules footballer

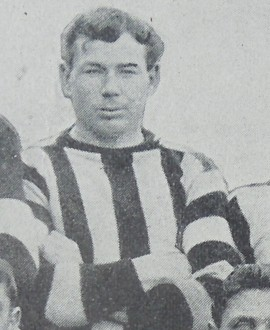
- McIvor in 1909

Personal information
- Born: 11 November 1883; Kerang, Victoria
- Died: 18 November 1930 (aged 47); Randwick, New South Wales
- Original teams: Wahgunyah, Numurkah
- Debut: Round 2, 8 May 1909, Collingwood vs. St Kilda, at Junction Oval
- Height: 179 cm (5 ft 10 in)
- Weight: 82 kg (181 lb)

Playing career^{1}
Years	Club	Games (Goals)
1909–11, 1914	Collingwood	29 (0)
- ^{1} Playing statistics correct to the end of 1914.

Career highlights
- Collingwood premiership player – 1910

Duncan McIvor (11 November 1883 – 18 November 1930) was an Australian rules footballer who played for the Collingwood Football Club in the Victorian Football League (VFL).

== Family ==
One of the five children of John McIvor (1851–1938), and Janet Elizabeth McIvor (1858–1914), née Fleming, Duncan McIvor was born at Hawkinston, near Kerang, Victoria, on 11 November 1883.

== Football ==
McIvor played in 29 games during four seasons over six years for Collingwood in the VFL. He played on the half-back flank for Collingwood in the team's 1910 Grand Final win over Carlton.

McIvor played in Collingwood's loss to Essendon in the 1911 Grand Final. This was his last game for over two years until he returned to play one more game in round 10, 1914, a win over Carlton.

== First AIF ==
On 24 June 1918 he applied for enlistment in the First AIF. His application to enlist was rejected, on medical grounds, on 4 July 1918.

== Death ==
He died at Randwick, New South Wales on 18 November 1930.
