= Mick Dowdle =

Australian rules footballer

Personal information
- Full name: Mick Dowdle
- Born: 3 July 1947 (age 79)
- Original team: Jerilderie
- Height: 173 cm (5 ft 8 in)
- Weight: 76 kg (168 lb)
- Position: Rover

Playing career^{1}
Years	Club	Games (Goals)
1964–71	North Melbourne	98 (89)
- ^{1} Playing statistics correct to the end of 1971.

Mick Dowdle (born 3 July 1947) is a former Australian rules footballer who played with North Melbourne in the Victorian Football League (VFL).

Dowdle played in Jerilderie's 1963 Coreen & District Football League premiership and also won the 1963 Coreen & DFL best and fairest award, the Archie Dennis Medal and is the youngest ever winner of this award, as a 16 year old.

Dowdle made his senior VFL debut against Fitzoy in round 17, in August 1964 at the Arden Street Oval, North Melbourne, as a 17 year old.
