= Lowesdale, New South Wales =

Lowesdale
- Town
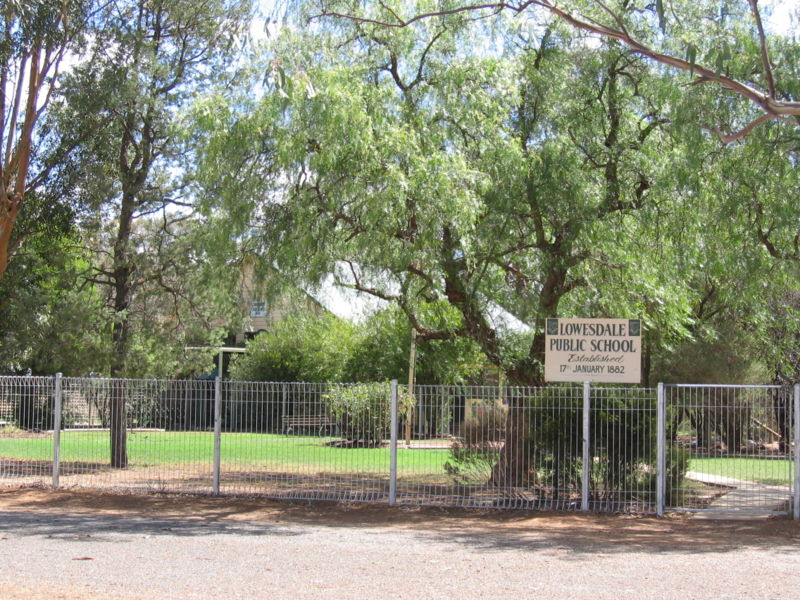
- Lowesdale Public School

- Coordinates: 35°51′0″S 146°22′0″E
- Country: Australia
- State: New South Wales
- LGA: Federation Council
- Location: 2 km (1.2 mi) from Buraja; 92 km (57 mi) from Berrigan

Government
  - State electorate: Albury
  - Federal division: Farrer
- Elevation: 132 m (433 ft)

Population
  - Total: 100 (2021 census)
- Postcode: 2646
- County: Hume

Lowesdale is a town community in Australia in the central south part of the Riverina and situated about 2 kilometres north of Buraja and 92 kilometres east of Berrigan on the Riverina Highway. At the 2021 census, Lowesdale had a population of 100.

Lowesdale Post Office opened on 1 August 1876 and closed in 1994.

== Sport and recreation ==
In 1915, the small community of Lowesdale entered two football teams in the Coreen & District Football Association, Lowesdale FC and Lowesdale Military FC, who won the 1915 premiership. Both teams went into recess in 1916 due to World War I, and neither was ever re-established.

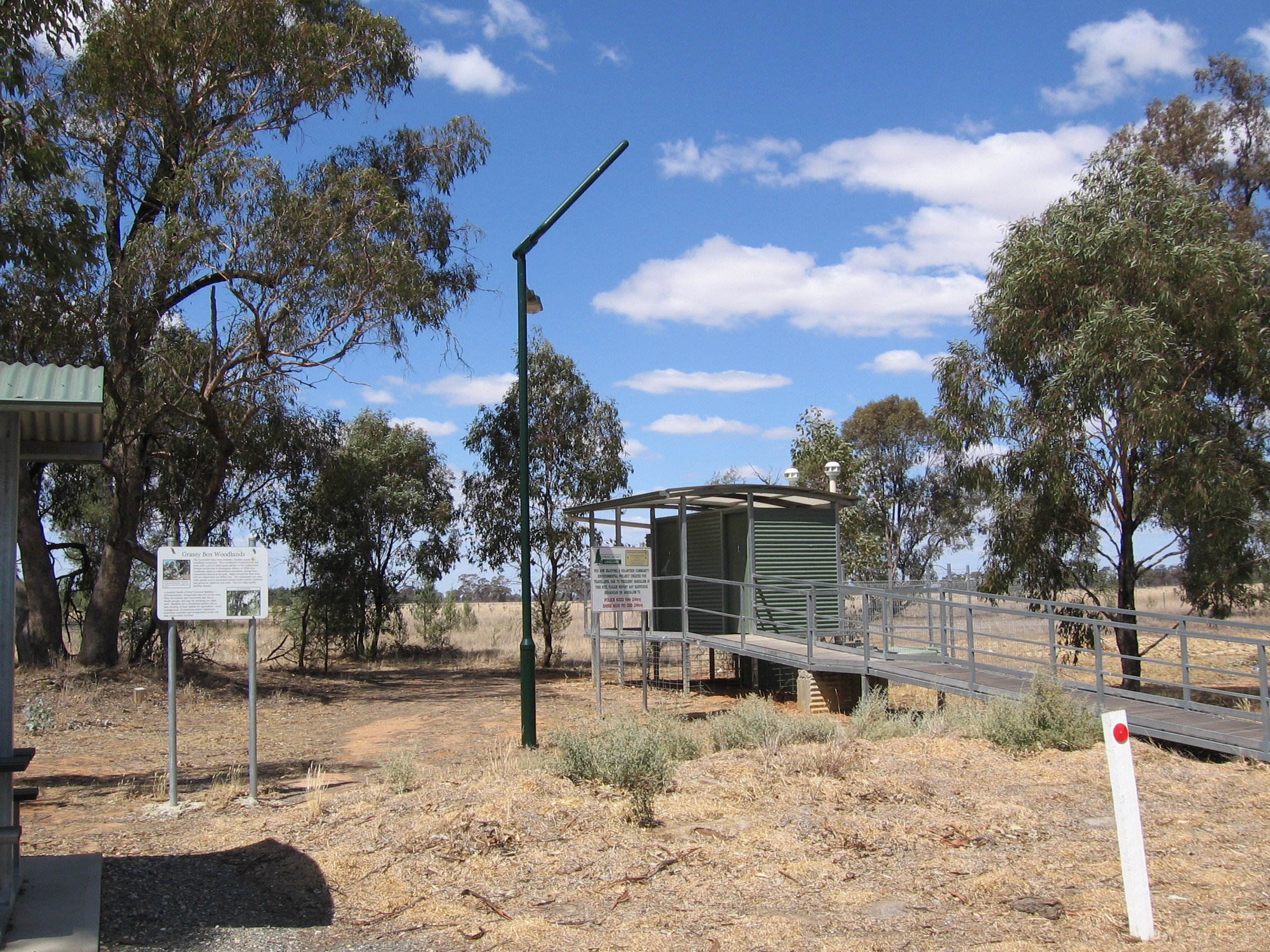
A rest area on the Riverina Highway, near Lowesdale
