= Daysdale =

- Town
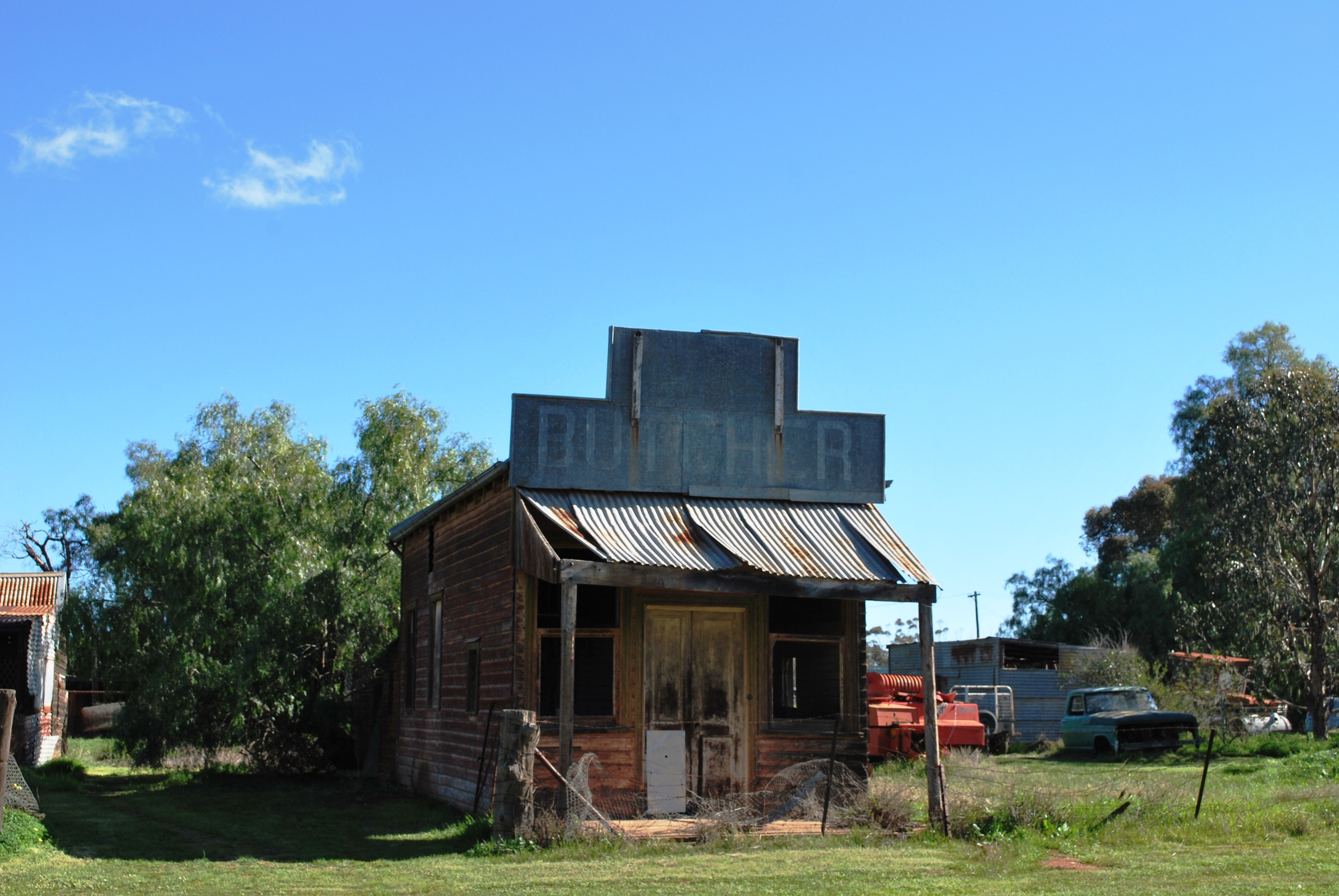
- Derelict butcher shop, 2009

- Coordinates: 35°39′0″S 146°18′0″E
- Country: Australia
- State: New South Wales
- LGA: Federation Council
- Location: 618 km (384 mi) SW of Sydney; 340 km (210 mi) NE of Melbourne; 87 km (54 mi) NW of Albury; 42 km (26 mi) N of Corowa; 13 km (8.1 mi) N of Coreen

Government
  - State electorate: Albury
  - Federal division: Farrer
- Elevation: 127 m (417 ft)

Population
  - Total: 83 (2021 census)
- Postcode: 2646
- County: Hume

Daysdale is a locality in the central south part of the Riverina region of the Australian state of New South Wales. It is about 618 kilometres (384 mi) south-west of the state capital Sydney and 340 kilometres (210 mi) north of Melbourne. At the 2021 census, Daysdale had a population of 83.

== History ==
Daysdale Post Office opened on 15 February 1876 and closed in 1993.

In 1876, the NSW Treasury issued a Return of Publican's Licence to William Curran Green of the Daysdale Hotel.

In 1878, Price's Hotel, Daysdale was completely destroyed by fire in 1878.

In 1883, the Daysdale School was established, thanks to the efforts of local MP, Mr. George Day, MLA.

The Exchange Hotel was completely destroyed by fire in 1899, which was later rebuilt and opened in late 1900, with an enlarged cellar, fitted out with a bar in it.

In 1913, Daysdale had a blacksmith's shop, hotel, post office, school and a store.

== Sports and recreation ==
The Daysdale Football Club was first established in 1894.

Daysdale FC won the Clear Hills Football Association premiership in 1903. In 1904 the re-forming of Clear Hills Football Association fell through as Clear Hills FC refused to play against Daysdale, under their present captain. Thus, Daysdale and Clear Hills did not play in any official competition, while Savenake then joined the Berrigan Football Association in 1904.

Daysdale FC won back to back Federal Football Association premierships in 1905 and 1906. Clear Hills then defeated Daysdale in the play off to win the 1907 Federal FA premiership and were again defeated in the 1908 grand final by Balldale.

In 1909 Daysdale FC played in the Urana District Football Association.

Daysdale FC joined the Coreen & District Football Association in 1910 and won the premiership, were undefeated premiers in 1911 and won their third consecutive flag in 1912. Daysdale went onto win four more premierships in - 1961, 1962, 1964 and in 1994 on their 100th Anniversary.

Daysdale's home ground venue in their early days was at Coad's Tank.

Daysdale were runners up in the Coreen & DFA in - 1913, 1914, 1915, 1920, 1923, 1932 and 1937.

In 1995, Daysdale merged with Coreen to form the Coreen Daysdale United FC and played in the Coreen & DFL until 2005, when the club then merged with Hopefield - Buraja to form the Coreen Daysdale Hopefield Buraja United FC (CDHBUFC) who played in the Coreen & DFL in 2006 and 2007, winning senior football premierships in both years, before joining the Hume Football League in 2008 after the Coreen & DFL folded after the 2007 season.

== Photo gallery ==
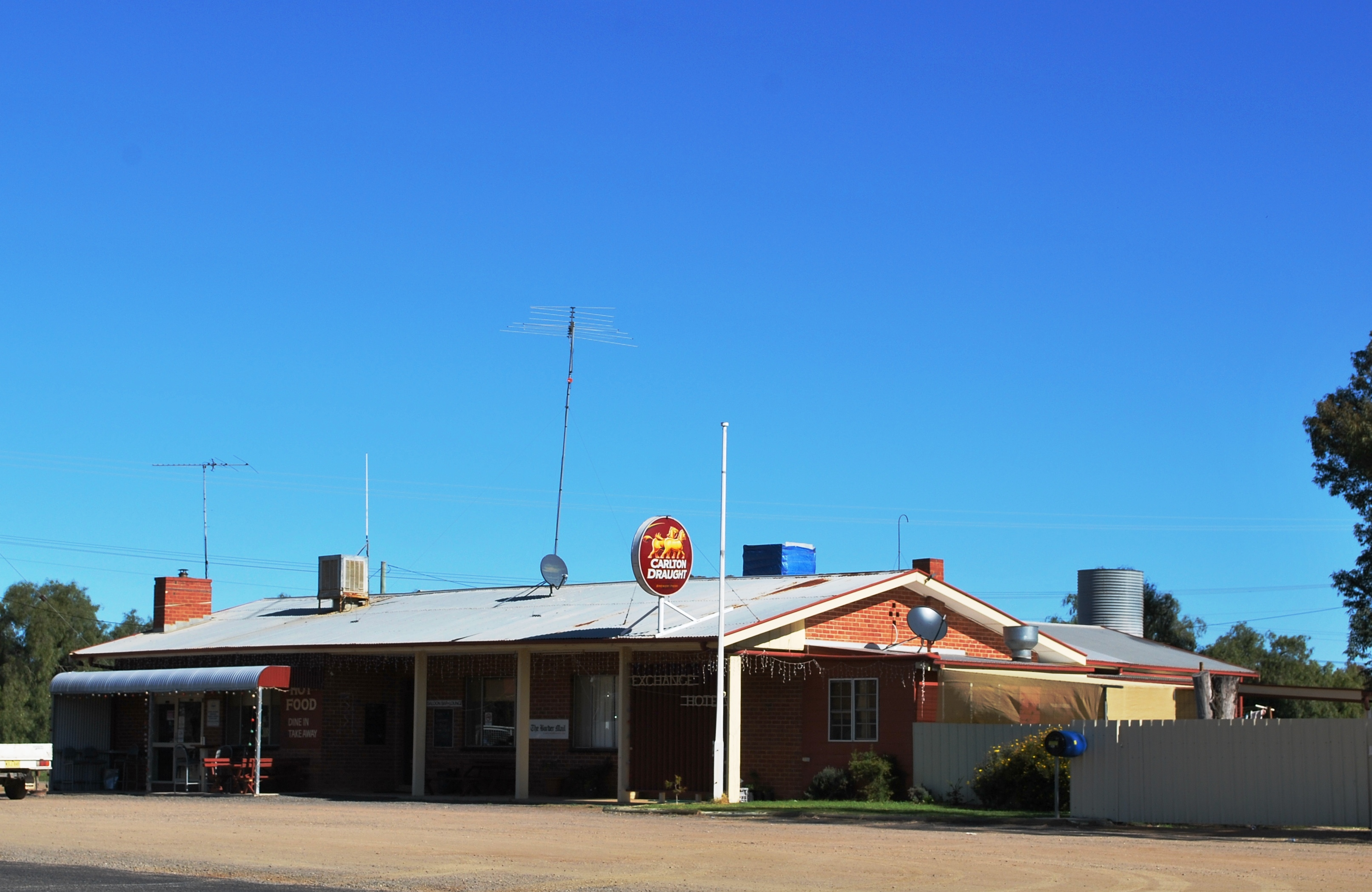
The Exchange Hotel at Daysdale

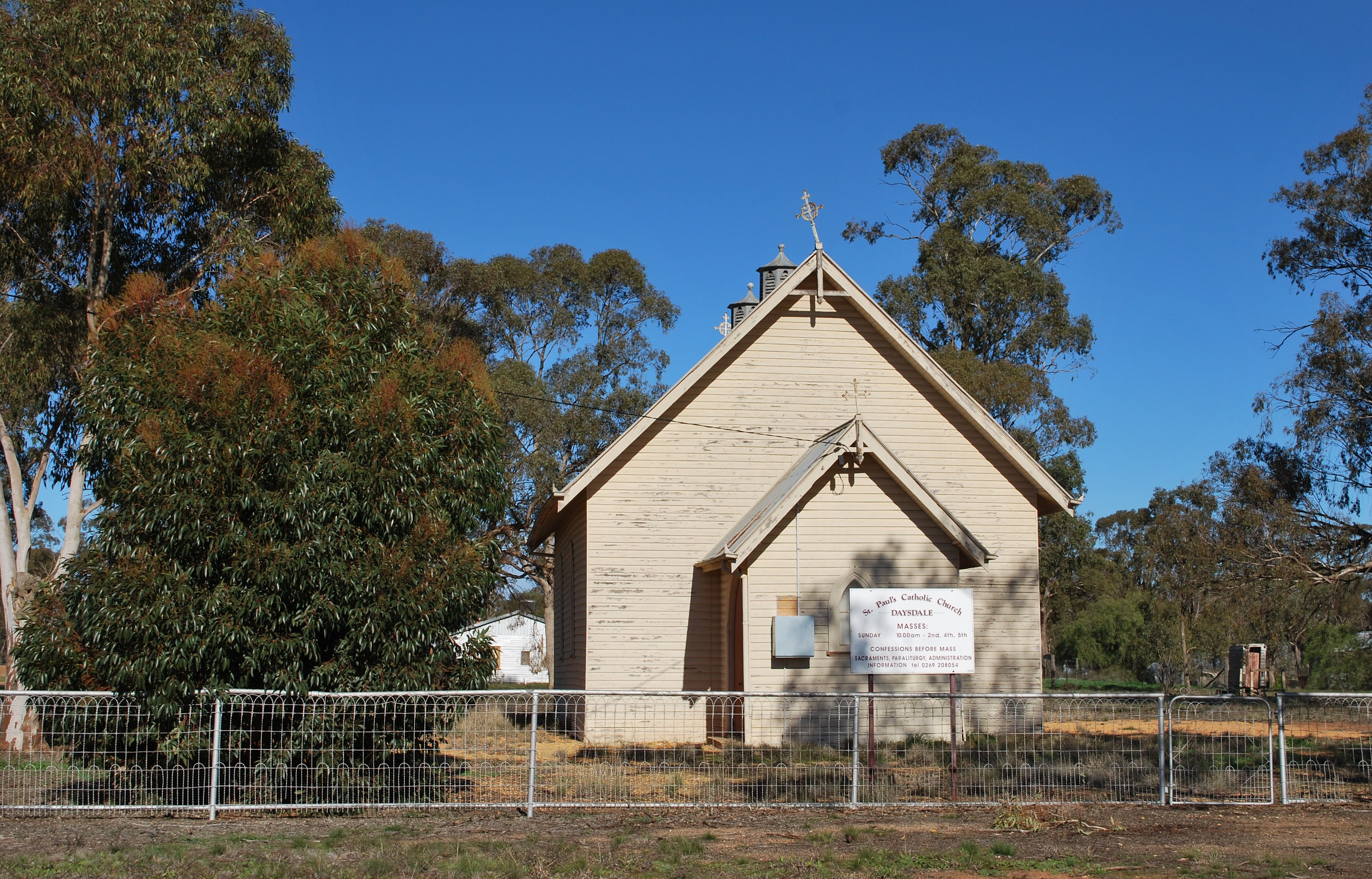
The Catholic Church at Daysdale
