= Wahgunyah Football Club =

Wahgunyah FNC

Names
- Full name: Wahgunyah Football Netball Club
- Nickname: Lions

Club details
- Founded: 1877; 149 years ago
- Colours: Maroon Blue Gold
- Competition: Tallangatta & District Football League
- Premierships: (11): 1907, 1919, 1948, 1949, 1955, 1956, 1968, 1997, 1998, 2002, 2004
- Ground: Wahgunyah Recreation Reserve, Wahgunyah, VIC.

Uniforms
Home

Other information
- Official website: Wahgunyah FNC website

Wahgunyah Football / Netball Club is an Australian rules football club based in North Eastern Victoria that currently competes in the Tallangatta & District Football League.

== Club history ==
The town of Wahgunyah has had an Australian rules football team since 1877 and Wahgunyah's first recorded match was against Corowa (a return match) on Saturday, 16 June 1877, played "on the hill" in Corowa, with Wahgunyah winning the first encounter by three goals to nothing. W Busch was the captain of Wahgunyah FC. Throughout 1877, there was talk of the Wahgunyah and Corowa Football Club's merging to form one stronger club and be called Border United Football Club, with this merger taking place in August 1877 and their first match as Border United was played against the Rutherglen Football Club in August 1877 and was captained by Jacob Levin. The Border United team wore pink and white colours.

The Wahgunyah Recreation Reserve was set aside by the Victorian Government in 1864 and was controlled by a Government appointed committee of Management.

In 1888, Border United FC fielded three teams, First Twenty, Second Twenty and a junior team that played against other local teams and towns.

Wahgunyah FC (Juniors) was re-established in 1897, with Mr. J Grimmond elected as president and decided that the club colours would be black and white (Magpies) and they decided to play at the racecourse in the Murray Valley Junior Football Association. The club won the 1897 and 1899 Murray Valley Junior Football Association premierships. The Murray Valley Junior Football Association was abandoned in May 1905.

In 1901, Mr. Hancock won the club's most consistent player award at a club dinner at Wahgunyah's Victoria Hotel.

Border United FC remained in place until 1905, when Corowa and Wahgunyah both entered stand alone teams in the Corowa District Football Association in 1906.

In 1907, Wahgunyah finished on top of the ladder, with eleven wins from twelve games in the Corowa and District Football Association and won the premiership.

Wahgunyah were runners to Howlong in the 1909 Ovens & Murray Junior Football Association grand final. William King won the club's Best all round player award in 1909. Interestingly, in 1896, King was suspended for life by the O&MFA after assaulting an umpire. In 1909, Wahgunyah defeated Corowa to win the local State School premiership.

In 1910, Wahgunyah were runners up to Lake Moodemere in the Ovens & Murray Junior Football Association grand final, after they walked off the ground at three quarter time due to excessively rough play.

Wahgunyah have been involved in two drawn Chiltern & District Football Association senior football grand finals, in 1924 and again in 1954, with Wahgunyah winning both grand finals replays. Details below.

== Football competitions timeline ==
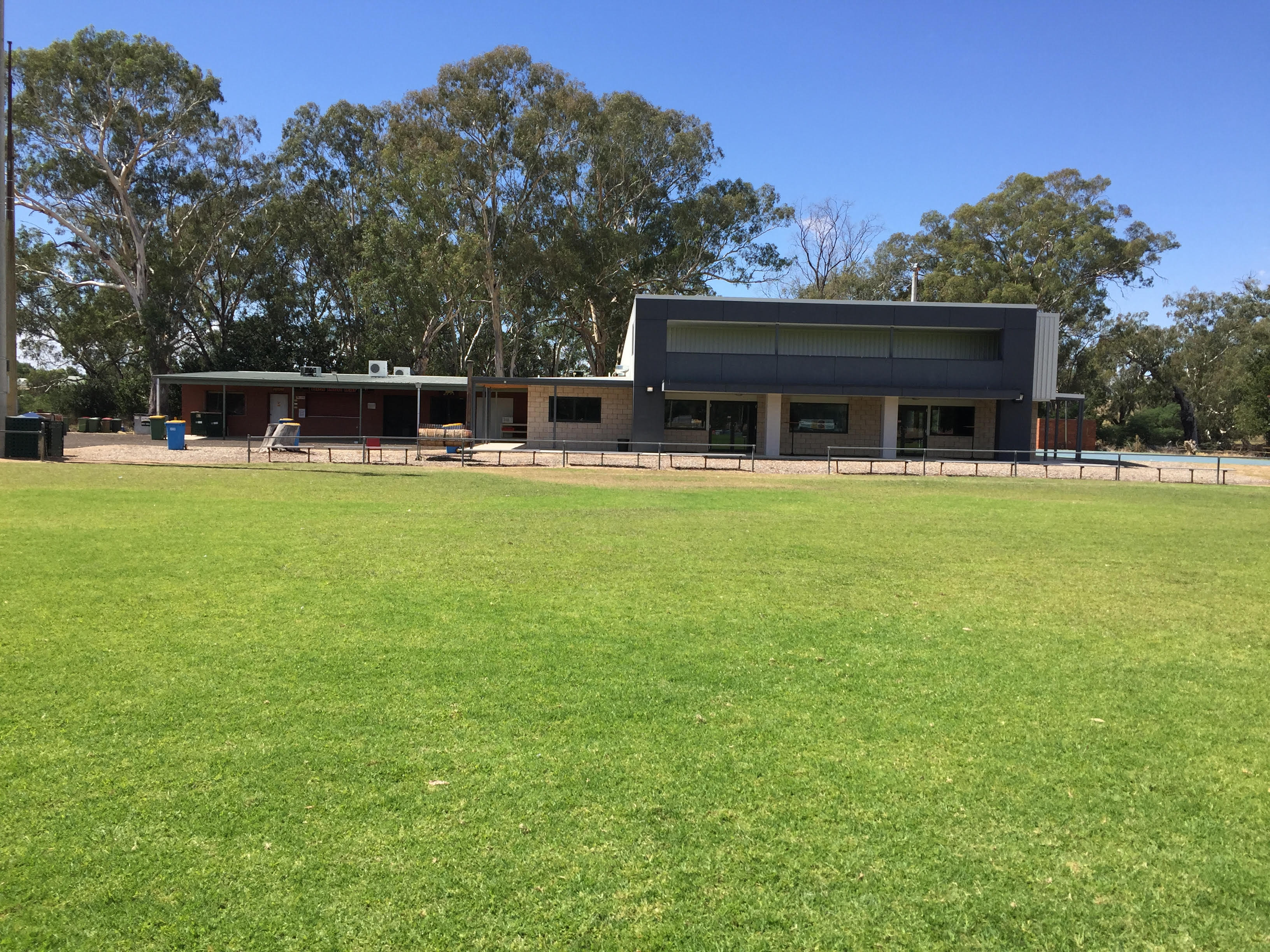
Wahgunyah FNC Clubrooms, 2017

- Ovens & Murray Football League
  - 1895 – 1905 (Border United FC)
- Murray Valley Junior Football Association
  - 1897 – 1904
- Corowa & District Football Association
  - 1906 and 1907 (Wahgunyah FC)
- Ovens & Murray Football League
  - 1908
- Ovens & Murray Junior Football Association
  - 1909 & 1910
- Rutherglen & District Football Association
  - 1911 & 1912
- Ovens & Murray Football League
  - 1913 to 1915, (Border United FC)
- Club in recess due to World War I
  - 1916 & 1917
- Rutherglen & Murray Football Association
  - 1918 (Border United FC)
- Chiltern & District Football Association
  - 1919 & 1920
- Ovens & Murray Football League
  - 1921
- Coreen & District Football League
  - 1922
- Chiltern & District Football Association
  - 1923 – 1929
- Corowa & District Football Association
  - 1930
- Chiltern & District Football Association
  - 1931 – 1937
- Club withdrew from the Chiltern & District Football Association
  - 1938. Wahgunyah FC withdrew from the C&DFA & Corowa Rovers FC entered a team in the C&DFA 1938 & 1939.
- Club in recess due to World War II
  - 1939 – 1943
- Murray Valley Patriotic Football League
  - 1944 & 1945 (Border United FC)
- Ovens & Murray Football League
  - 1946 & 1947 (Border United FC)
- Coreen & District Football League
  - 1948 & 1949
- Chiltern & District Football Association
  - 1950 – 1956
- Coreen & District Football League
  - 1957 – 2007
- Tallangatta & District Football League
  - 2008 – 2021

== Football Premierships ==
Juniors

- Murray Valley Junior Football Association
  - 1897, 1899.

Seniors

- Corowa & District Football Association
  - 1907
- Chiltern & District Football Association
  - 1919, 1924, 1954, 1955
- Leeton Football Club – Knockout Competition
  - Border United FC
    - 1946
- Coreen & District Football League
  - 1948, 1949, 1968, 1997, 1998, 2002, 2004.

Reserves

- Coreen & District Football League – (1976 to 2007)
  - 1977, 1978, 1984, 1997, 1999, 2002, 2007.

Thirds

- Coreen & District Football League – (1980 to 2007)
  - 1987, 1998, 2007.
- Tallangatta & District Football League – (2008 to present day)
  - 2012

Fourths

- Tallangatta & District Football League – (2008 to present day)
  - 2009, 2010, 2012

== Football runners up ==
Juniors

- Murray Valley Junior Football Association
  - Wahgunyah
    - 1898, 1900
- Corowa & District Football Association
  - Wahgunyah
    - 1906
- Ovens & Murray Junior Football Association
  - Wahgunyah
    - 1909

Seniors

- Ovens & Murray Football League
  - Border United
    - 1900, 1902, 1903, 1904, 1914.
- Chiltern & District Football Association
  - Wahgunyah
    - 1926
- Murray Valley Patriotic Football League
  - Border United
    - 1944, 1945
- Coreen & District Football League
  - Wahgunyah
    - 1978, 1982, 1999

== Netball Premierships ==
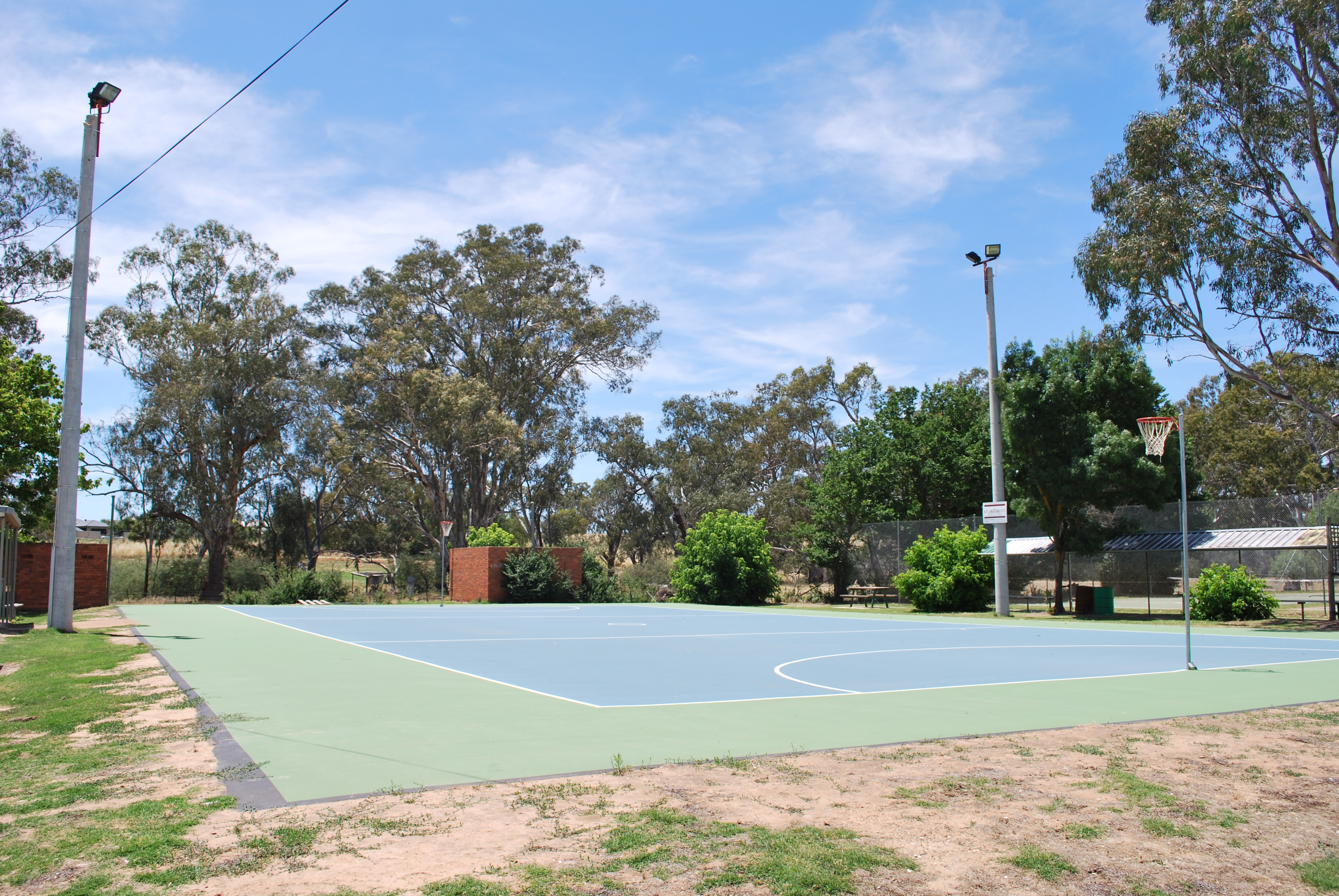
Wahgunyah FNC Netball Court

A. Grade

- Tallangatta & District Football League – (2008 to present day)
  - 2009

B. Grade

- Tallangatta & District Football League – (2008 to present day)
  - 2009

C. Grade

- Tallangatta & District Football League – (2008 to present day)
  - Nil

D. Grade (18 & Under)

- Tallangatta & District Football League – (2008 to present day)
  - Nil

E. Grade (15 & Under)

- Tallangatta & District Football League – (2008 to present day)
  - Nil

F. Grade (13 & Under)

- Tallangatta & District Football League – (2008 to present day)
  - Nil

== League Best & Fairest Awards ==
Senior Football

- Chiltern & District Football Association – Higgins Medal
  - 1955 & 1956 – John Voss. Voss was also runner up in the Chiltern & DFL award in 1954.
- Coreen & DFL: Archie Denis Medal
  - 1957, 1961, 1965, 1966 – John Voss. Voss was also runner up in 1962 & 1970.
  - 1976 – Len Chandler
  - 1977, 1981 – Len Johnstone
  - 1989 – Wayne Milthorpe
  - 2002 – Scott Parker

Reserves

- Coreen & DFL
  - 1984 – T Cope
  - 1989 – Mick Upton
  - 2005 – Darren Harvey

Thirds

- Coreen & DFL
  - 1980 – R Eyres
  - 1988 – Wayne Johnstone
  - 1991 – P Roksandic
  - 1993 – Grant Jolly
  - 2003 – Scott Brunnemeyer
  - 2004 & 2005 – Taylor Duryea

== Club Best & Fairest ==
Senior Football

- 1948 – Neville Webster
- 1949 – Tom Hennessey
- 1950 – Ray Allan
- 1952 – John Voss
- 1953 –
- 1954 – John Voss

== VFL / AFL players ==
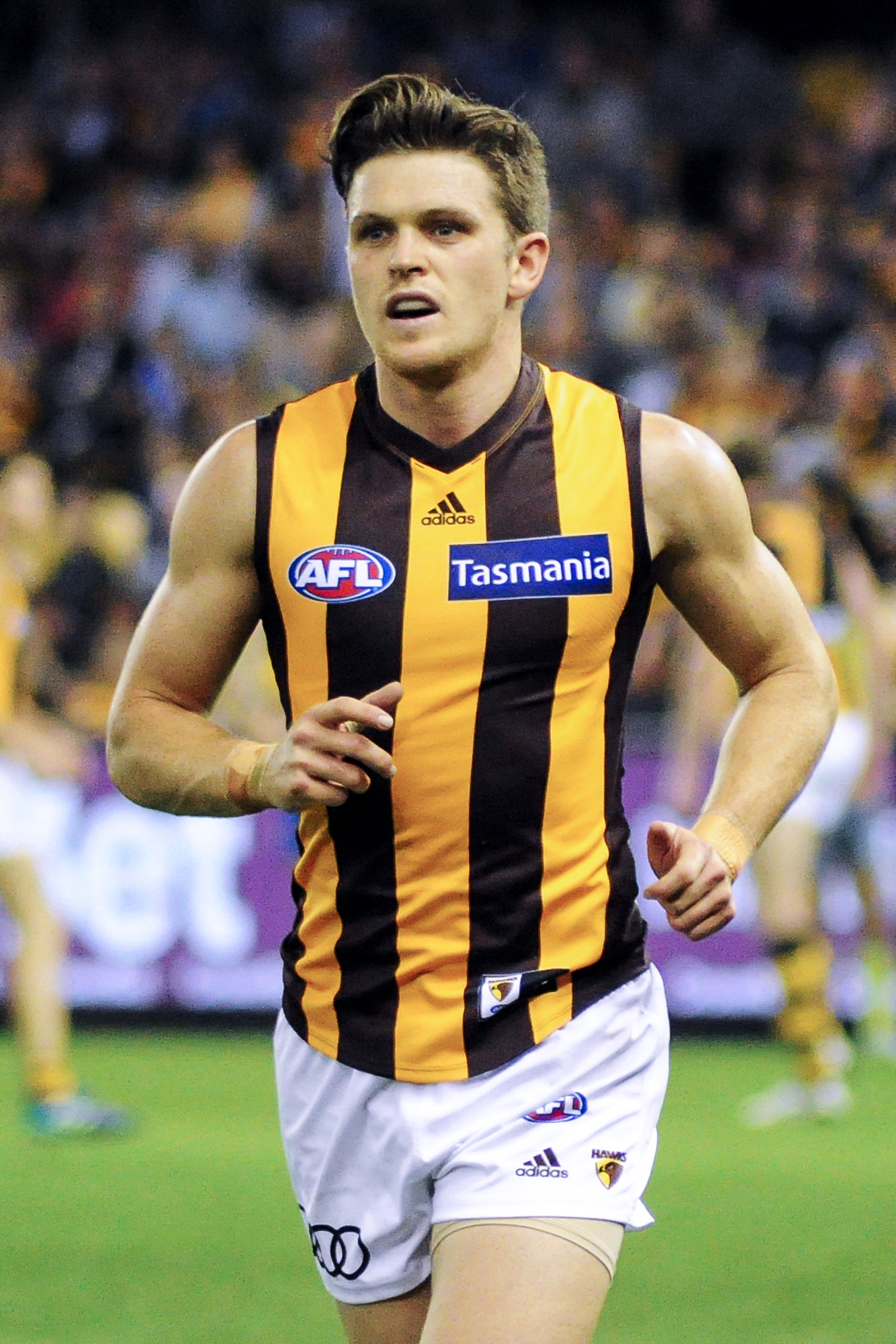
Taylor Duryea, 2018

The following footballers played with Wahgunyah FNC prior to playing senior VFL / AFL football or were drafted into the AFL. The year indicates their VFL / AFL debut.

- 1909 – Duncan McIvor – Collingwood
- 1994 – Damien Houlihan – Collingwood
- 1997 – Adam Houlihan – Geelong
- 2000 – Ryan Houlihan – Carlton
- 2001 – Josh Houlihan – St. Kilda (No. 49 – 2001 AFL Draft. No senior AFL games)
- 2010 – Taylor Duryea – Hawthorn

The following VFL / AFL Footballers were born in Wahgunyah, Victoria.

- 1903 – Gordon Rickards – St. Kilda
- 1911 – Arthur Francis – Fitzroy
- 1930 – Bert Mills – Hawthorn
- 1940 – Shadrach James – Fitzroy
