= Damian Houlihan =

Australian rules footballer

Personal information
- Full name: Damian Houlihan
- Born: 30 July 1975 (age 51); Wahgunyah, Victoria
- Original teams: Wahgunyah, Corowa-Rutherglen
- Draft: 15th, 1992 AFL draft
- Height: 188 cm (6 ft 2 in)
- Weight: 93 kg (205 lb)
- Position: Forward

Playing career^{1}
Years	Club	Games (Goals)
1994	Collingwood	11 (6)
1998	North Melbourne	0 (0)
- ^{1} Playing statistics correct to the end of 1998.

Damian Houlihan (born 30 July 1975) is a former Australian rules footballer who played with Collingwood in the Australian Football League (AFL).

Houlihan made his senior Ovens & Murray Football League debut as a 15 year old with Corowa-Rutherglen in round one, 1991 and kicked nine goals verses Lavington.

Houlihan was the first of a set of four brothers to be drafted to the AFL. His younger brothers Adam and Ryan also became league footballers and another brother Josh was briefly on St Kilda's list.

A forward, he was picked up by Collingwood with the 15th selection of the 1992 AFL draft. He kicked three goals with his first three kicks in league football, against Geelong at the Melbourne Cricket Ground. In his fifth AFL game, against Adelaide, he was awarded three Brownlow Medal votes, despite having just 12 disposals. He missed three matches mid season after being suspended for striking Richmond player Chris Naish. By the end of the year he had played 11 games and a back injury would ensure he never made it into the park in 1995.

After spending the 1997 season with Tatura in the Goulburn Valley Football League, Houlihan was selected by North Melbourne in the AFL pre-season draft. North Melbourne made their second grand final in three years in 1998 and Houlihan wasn't able to break into the seniors.

Delisted by North Melbourne, he went on to have a long career in country football. His greatest performance came in the 2000 Ovens & Murray Football League (OMFL) Grand Final, playing as an assistant coach for his original club Corowa-Rutherglen, when he kicked ten goals. This broke the previous record for an OMFL grand final, which was nine goals by Albury's Doug Strang, and also helped Corowa-Rutherglen to a 108-point win, another league record. Houlihan, who also played at East Burwood and Gisborne, joined Sunbury in 2007. He then played for Keilor in 2008 and was a member of their premiership team that year, again putting in a strong grand final performance. He returned to Sunbury in 2009 and then finished his career with a season at North Bendigo in 2010.
