= Adam Houlihan =

Australian rules footballer (born 1978)

Personal information
- Full name: Adam L. Houlihan
- Born: 6 April 1978 (age 48)
- Original teams: Wahgunyah, Corowa-Rutherglen
- Height: 185 cm (6 ft 1 in)
- Weight: 84 kg (185 lb)

Playing career^{1}
Years	Club	Games (Goals)
1997–2001	Geelong	61 (75)
2002–2004	Richmond	33 (24)
Total		94 (99)
- ^{1} Playing statistics correct to the end of 2004.

Career highlights
- AFL Rising Star nominee: 1997

Adam L. Houlihan (born 6 April 1978) is a former Australian rules footballer for the Geelong Football Club and the Richmond Football Club in the Australian Football League (AFL). He is one of four brothers who were all drafted to Australian Football League clubs, alongside Damian, Ryan and Josh, from Wahgunyah on the Murray River, in northern Victoria.

== Career ==
=== Geelong: 1995–2001 ===
Houlihan made his debut in Round 4, 1997 with the Geelong Football Club against Essendon. He wore the number 3 guernsey. He was drafted as a compensatory selection (second overall) in the 1995 pre-season draft from the Murray Bushrangers at the age of 16. He actually started out as a jockey but a growth spurt put an end to that and he turned his attention to Australian rules football, playing senior football for Corowa-Rutherglen at sixteen. Houlihan made a name for himself as a talented half forward, kicking five goals in several games. He managed 14 games in his debut season but just one the following year after a series of injuries. He played two games early in 1999, having little impact. He returned to play all the final eight games and established himself in 2000, playing 22 of 23 games and a top 10 best and fairest finish. But after playing 12 of the first 13 games in 2001, his form fell away, playing just two more games and he was then delisted.

=== Richmond: 2002–2004 ===
Houlihan was drafted by Richmond and resumed his career there in 2002, wearing the number 44 guernsey. He played the first 12 games in 2002, including a three-goal effort in Round 11 but only managed one further game, spending most of the remainder of the season in the Victorian Football League (VFL). He played 16 games in 2003, including four and five goal efforts. A hamstring injury kept him out for most of 2004, returning late in the season for four games but incoming coach Terry Wallace decided Houlihan did not fit in with his plans.

=== Post-AFL career ===
Houlihan continued to play with Richmond's VFL affiliate Coburg in 2005. At 26 years of age, Houlihan decided that his career was already over and he ruled out playing AFL football again. He instead returned to his earlier interest in horse racing, hosting a horse-racing tips show with Brett Phillips and Nick Evans on radio station SEN 1116 and training jockeys in diet and fitness. In 2007 he chose to take some great advise from mentor and now business partner Bruce Armstrong and start his own promotional merchandise business called CorpEdge Marketing. He is currently playing football with Old Scotch Football Club.
