= Coreen =

- Town
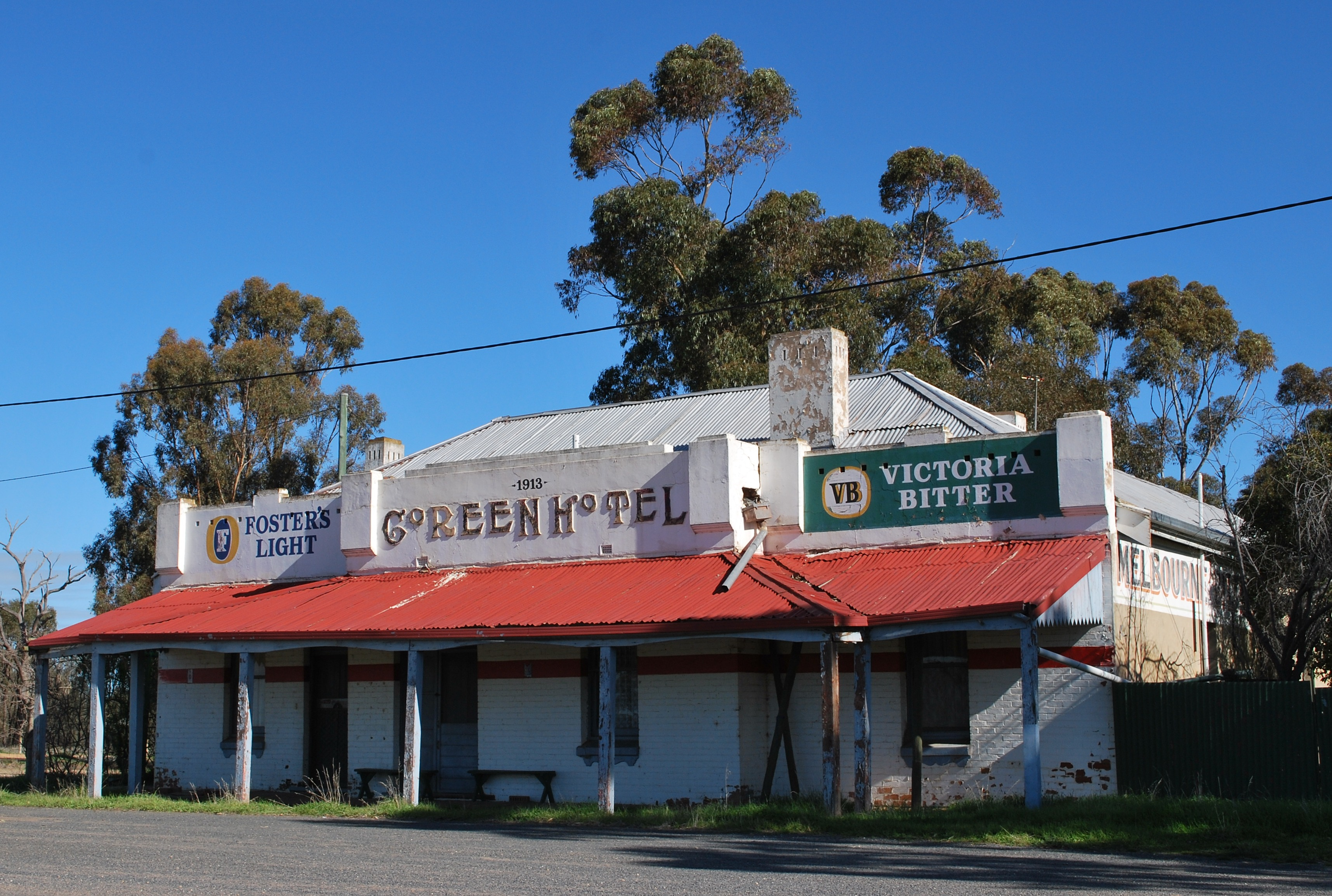
- The now disused Coreen Hotel.

- Coordinates: 35°46′0″S 146°21′0″E
- Country: Australia
- State: New South Wales
- LGA: Federation Council
- Location: 609 km (378 mi) SW of Sydney; 328 km (204 mi) N of Melbourne; 74 km (46 mi) NW of Albury; 30 km (19 mi) N of Corowa

Government
  - State electorate: Albury
  - Federal division: Farrer
- Elevation: 131 m (430 ft)

Population
  - Total: 122 (SAL 2021)
- Postcode: 2646
- County: Hume

Coreen is a locality in the Riverina region of New South Wales, Australia. The locality is about 609 kilometres (378 mi) south west of the state capital, Sydney and 328 kilometres (204 mi) north of Melbourne.

Coreen is located just past the turn off to Berrigan along the Riverina highway.

== History ==
Coreen Post Office opened on 1 January 1900 and closed in 1976.

Mr. W A Martin from the Coreen Wine Hall purchased the liquor licence from the Phoenix Hotel in Corowa in 1912 and then built and opened the Coreen Hotel in 1913.

== Sport and recreation ==
The Coreen Football Club was established in 1906 when they joined the Federal Football Association where they played up until 1908. Coreen then joined the Coreen & District Football Association in 1909. Coreen also supplied a second team in the Coreen & DFA between 1910 and 1915 in the Coreen Settler's FC who went onto win premierships in 1913 and 1914.

The Coreen Settler's side was established from players from a Government land sub-division settlement in the Coreen District which was established in 1907.

Coreen FC played in nine consecutive grand finals between 1924 and 1931, winning three Coreen & DFA premierships in - 1926, 1929 and 1930.

Coreen FC would go onto win another ten Coreen & DFA senior football premierships in - 1933, 1946, 1947, 1951, 1974, 1975, 1978, 1980, 1987 and 1991 before they merged with Daysdale FC in 1995 and played as the Coreen Daysdale United FC until 2005.

In 2006, Coreen Daysdale United FC merged with Hopefield Buraja FC to form the Coreen Daysdale Hopefield Buraja United "Saints" FC (CDHBUFC) and won the 2006 and 2007 Coreen & DFL premierships. In 2008 CDHBUFC joined the Hume Football League after the Coreen & DFL folded. They are now known as "The Power" and wear a black, white and teal blue jumper.

== Gallery ==
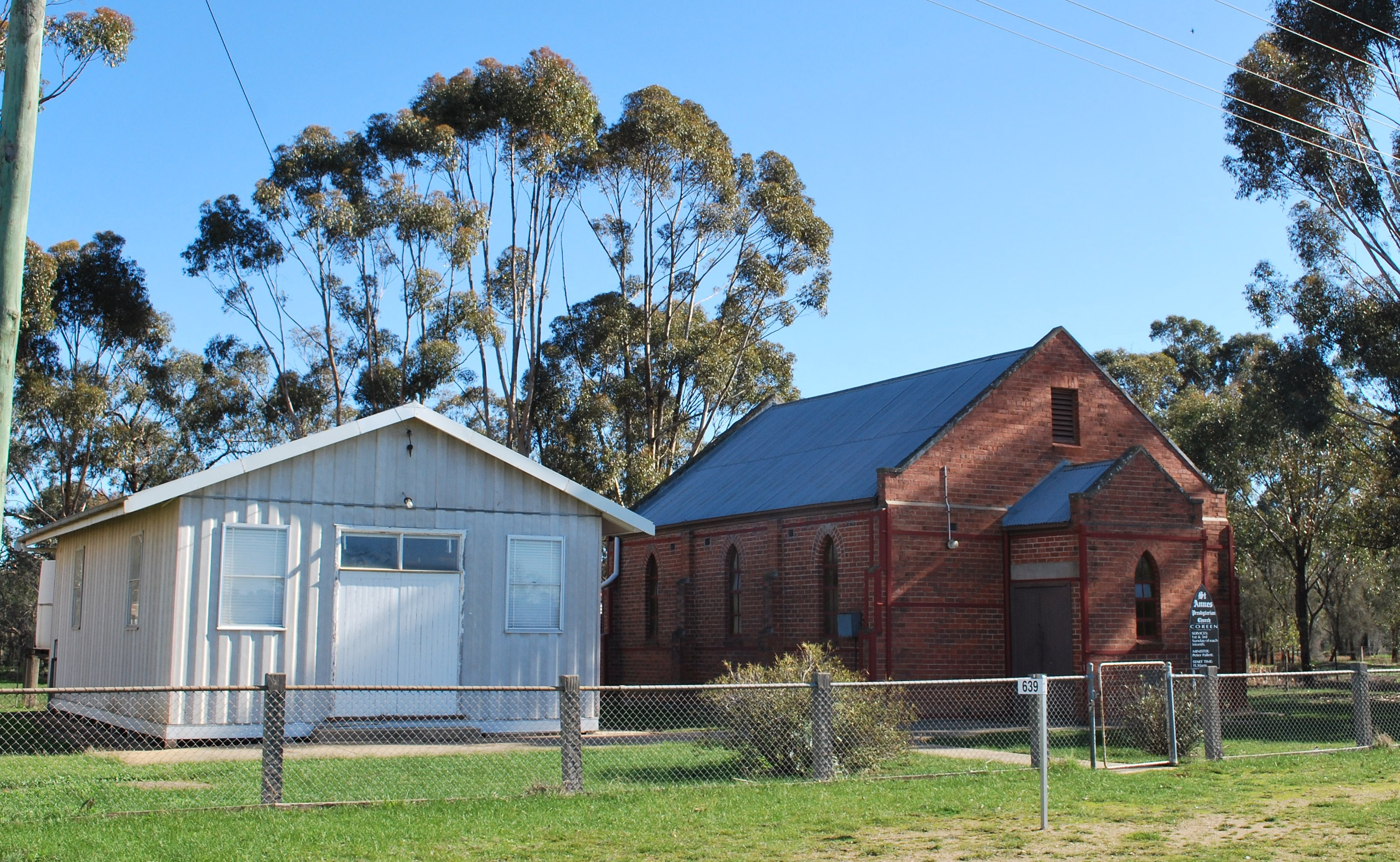
The Presbyterian church and community hall

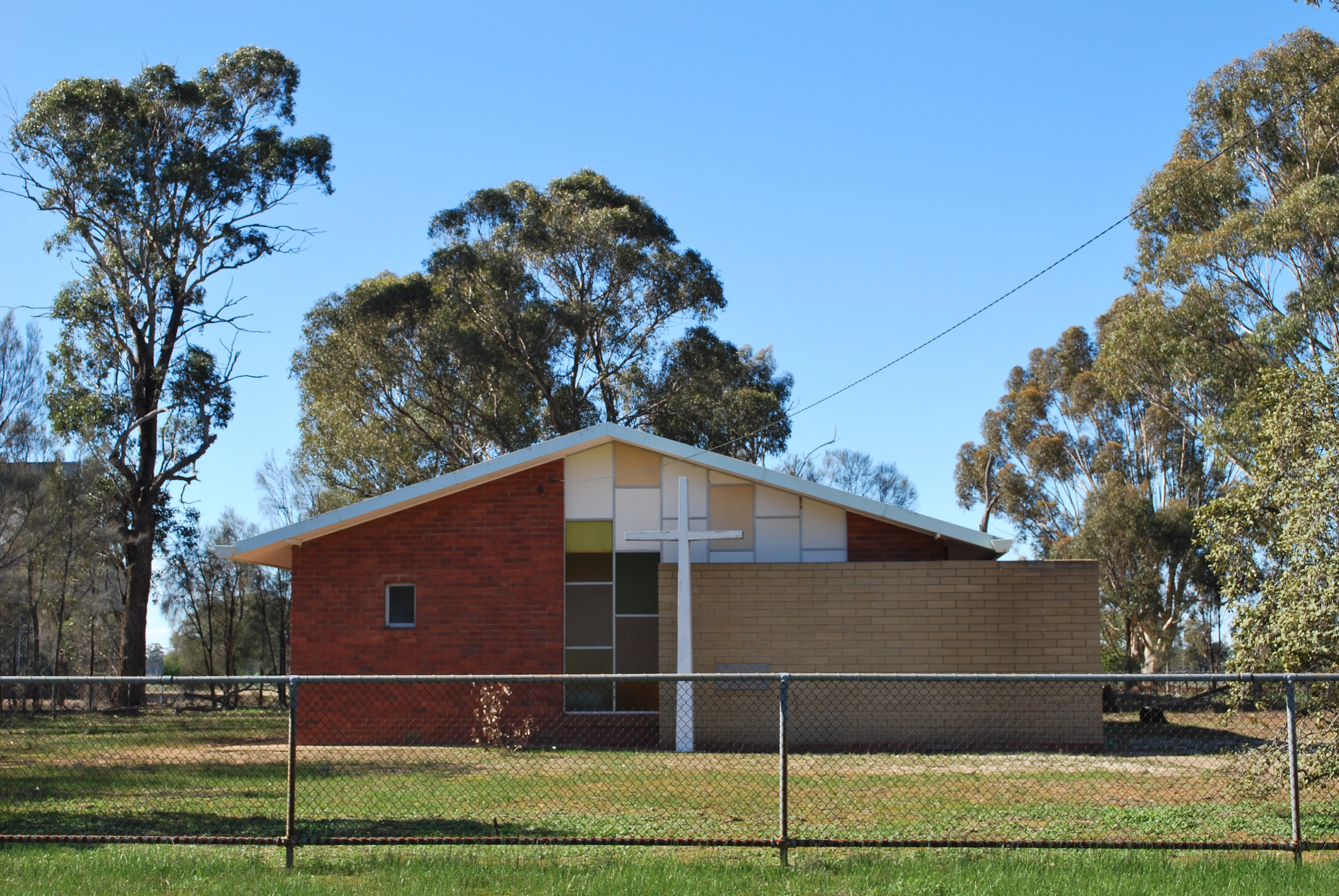
Church at Coreen
