= Buraja =

- Town
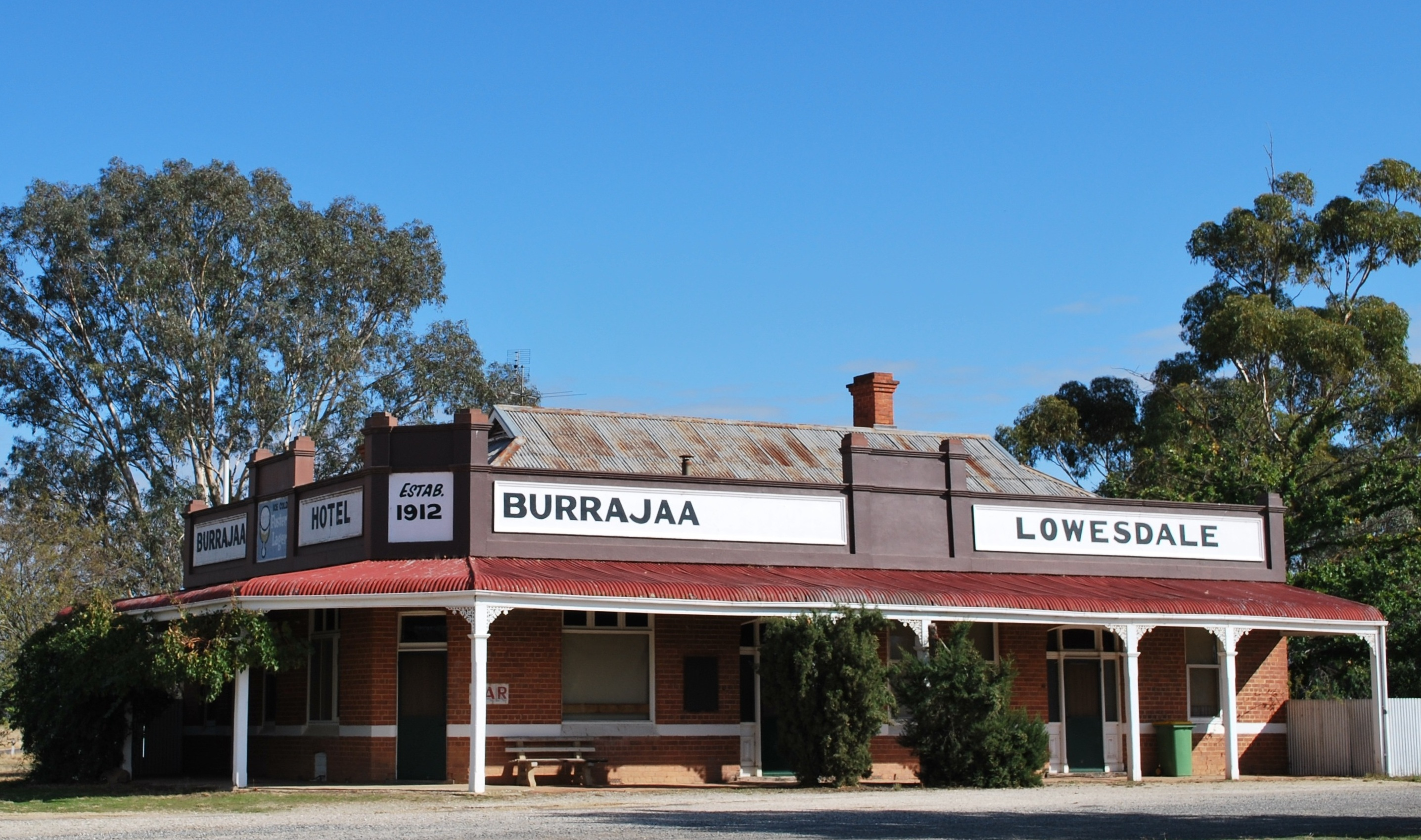
- The Buraja Hotel, no longer in use as a hotel.

- Coordinates: 35°51′30″S 146°22′16″E
- Country: Australia
- State: New South Wales
- LGA: Federation Council
- Location: 618 km (384 mi) from Sydney; 61 km (38 mi) from Albury; 32 km (20 mi) from Howlong

Government
  - State electorate: Albury
  - Federal division: Farrer
- Elevation: 137 m (449 ft)
- Postcode: 2646
- County: Hume

Buraja (/ˈbʌrədʒə/ BURR-ə-jə) is a town community in the central-south part of the Riverina. It is about 92 kilometres (57 mi) east of Berrigan on the Riverina Highway.

The Aboriginal name Buraja means ‘a swamp with young trees growing.’ When people settled in the Buraja district in the 1860s there were two parishes – Lowes and Buraja. The name Lowes (Lowesdale) was taken from one of the owners of ‘Buraja Station,’ a local farm.

The small town of Burrajaa or Burryjaa or Burryja, was spelt in a variety of ways in various newspapers between 1900 and 1950, with the most recent spelling of the town being settled as – "Buraja".

== History ==
There was a Burryjaa Station, near Corowa, with an area of 26,000 acres, was initially owned by Mr. W F Martin in 1857. The property was later auctioned in March, 1876.

The earliest reports of a hotel in Burraja was in 1876, when the license changed hands. Then in 1877 a Publican's License was approved for the Burraja Hotel.

The first recorded race meeting was in May 1878, with five races on the Queen's Birthday meeting and they used to be held at the paddock next to Mrs Darby's Hotel, Lowesdale.

A new brick hotel building was commenced in 1911 on behalf of Licensee, Mr. S.R.E. Loveridge. The new hotel building was opened in 1912. The hotel was delicensed in 1999 apparently.

== Sports and recreation ==
The Burrajaa Football Club was first established in 1894. Buraja FC and Hopefield FC merged in 1950 to form the Hopefield Buraja FC. Then in 2006, Coreen Daysdale FC & Hopefield Buraja FC merged to form the Coreen Daysdale Hopefield Buraja United FC.

Football Timeline

- 1894 – 1900: Club first established in 1894, playing matches against other local teams, but not in any formal competitions.
- 1901: Riverina Football Association. Premiers
- 1902: Clear Hills Football Association
- 1903 & 1904: Club may have been in recess.
- 1905: Federal Football Association
- 1906: Corowa Football Association
- 1907 & 1908: Federal Football Association
- 1909 – 1911: Coreen & District Football Association (Burrajaa FC)
- 1910 – 1912: Coreen & District Football Association (Burrajaa Village FC)
- 1913 & 1914: Coreen & District Football Association (Burrajaa FC)
- 1915 – 1918: Club in recess. WW1
- 1919 – 1929: Coreen & District Football Association (Premiers: 1924)
- 1930 – 1935: Corowa & District Football Association
- 1936 – 1940: Coreen & District Football Association
- 1941 – 1945: Club in recess. WW2
- 1946 – 1949: Coreen & District Football Association
- 1950 – 2003: Coreen & District Football League (Hopefield – Buraja FC) Premiers:1950, 1960, 1973, 1982, 1995, 1996.
- 2004 & 2005: Club in recess.
- 2006 & 2007: Coreen & District Football League (Coreen Daysdale Hopefield Buraja United FC) Premiers: 2006, 2007.
- 2008 – Present: Hume Football League

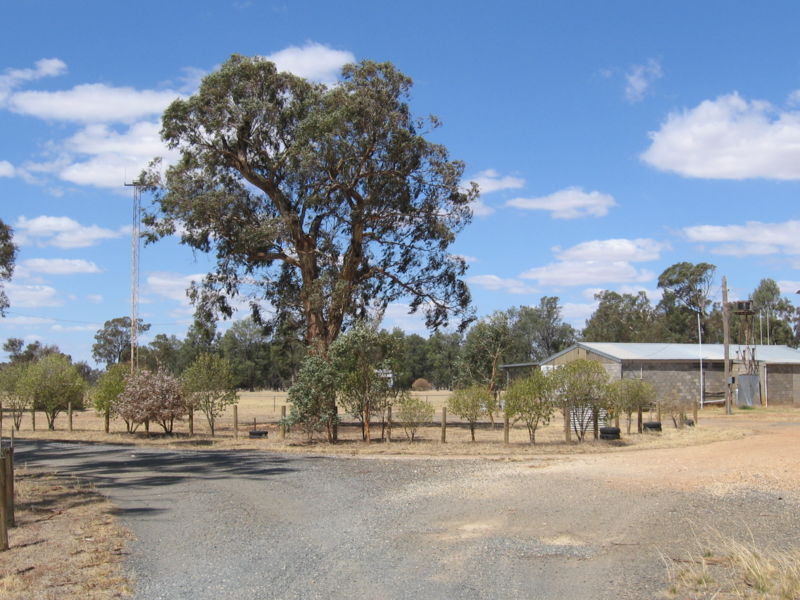
Buraja Recreation Reserve

== Links ==
- Coreen Daysdale Hopefield Buraja United FNC
- 1960 – Coreen FL Premiers: Hopefield Buraja FC team photo
