= Hopefield, New South Wales =

Hopefield
- Town
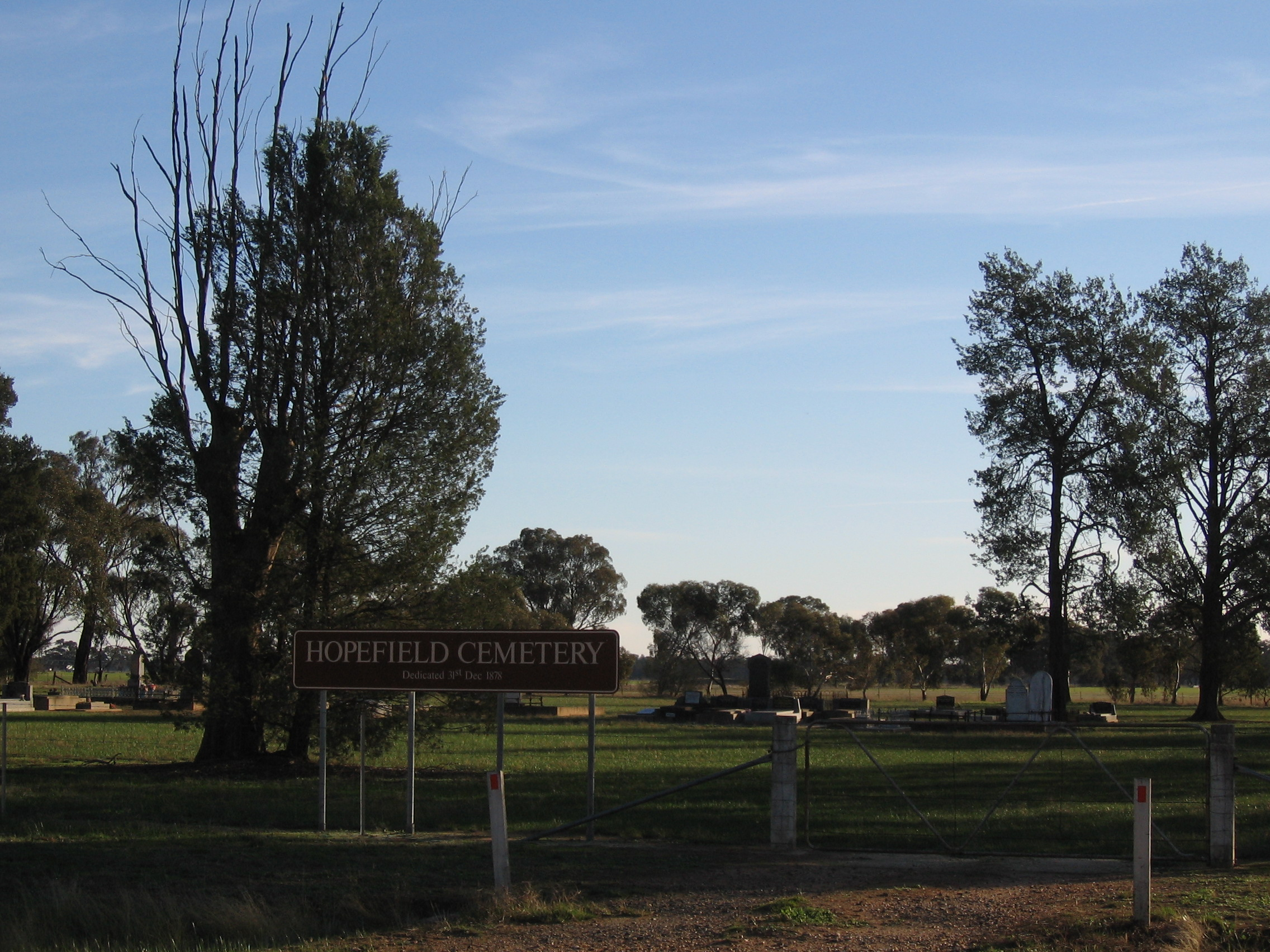
- Hopefield cemetery

- Coordinates: 35°54′S 146°26′E
- Country: Australia
- State: New South Wales
- LGA: Federation Council
- Location: 12 km (7.5 mi) from Balldale; 12 km (7.5 mi) from Corowa

Government
  - State electorate: Albury
  - Federal division: Farrer
- Elevation: 145 m (476 ft)

Population
  - Total: 308 (2006 census)
- Postcode: 2646
- County: Hume

Hopefield is a rural community in the central south part of the Riverina. It is situated by road, about 12 kilometres south west of Balldale and 12 kilometres north east of Corowa. At the 2006 census, Hopefield had a population of 308 people.

== History ==
Hopefield Post Office opened on 1 October 1882 and closed in 1954.

In 1915, the Hopefield Hotel was built by local builder, J Mills and was situated right near the Railway Station.

In 1946, the Hopefield Hotel, a brick building was completely destroyed by fire.

In 1948, the transfer of the Hopefield Hotel's liquor license to Forster, NSW was refused, then in 1953, the license transfer was finally approved to a new hotel in Forster.

== Sports and recreation ==
The Hopefield Football Club was established in 1922 and played in the Coreen & District Football Association for that one season only.

After a 21 year break Hopefield FC reformed in 1943 to play several games against the Corowa Royals FC in the "Corowa Hostelry Premiership" competition.

In 1944, Hopefield FC played in the Coreen & District Patriotic Football Association and lost their semi final match to Rennie.

Hopefield FC played in the Coreen & District Junior Football League in 1945, then in 1946 they joined the Coreen & District Football League when it was re-formed, with Hopefield FC played in this competition up until 1949, when they merged with Buraja for the 1950 Coreen & DFA season to form the Hopefield Buraja FC.

In 1948, Hopefield FC captain-coach, Ray Warford won the Charles Wilson Medal for the best and fairest player in the Coreen & District Football League.

Hopefield Buraja won senior Coreen & District Football League football premierships in - 1950, 1960, 1973, 1982, 1995 and 1996,

Hopefield Buraja "Bulldogs" FC went into recess in 2004 and 2005, then in 2006 merged with Coreen Daysdale United FC to form the Coreen Daysdale Hopefield Buraja United "Saints" FC (CDHBUFC) and won the 2006 and 2007 Coreen & DFL premierships. In 2008 CDHBUFC joined the Hume Football League after the Coreen & DFL folded. They are now known as "The Power" and wear a black, white and teal blue jumper.

The Hopefield Cricket Club was formed in September, 1921, with Mr. J Norman elected as President.
