= Federation Council (New South Wales) =

- Local government area
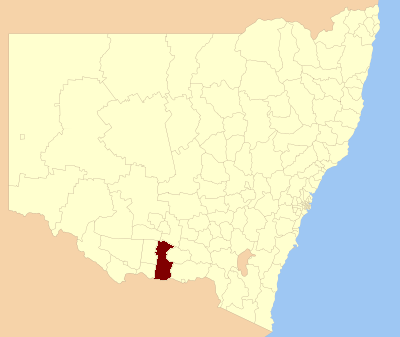
- Location in New South Wales

- Interactive map of Federation Council
- Coordinates: 35°34′S 146°18′E
- Country: Australia
- State: New South Wales
- Region: Murray
- Established: 12 May 2016
- Council seat: Corowa

Government
  - Mayor: Cheryl Cook; deputy mayor is Rowena Black
  - State electorate: Albury
  - Federal division: Farrer

Area
  - Total: 5,685 km^{2} (2,195 sq mi)

Population
  - Total: 12,899 (LGA 2021)
- Postcode: 2646
- Website: Federation Council
LGAs around Federation Council
Murrumbidgee	Narrandera	Murrumbidgee
Murrumbidgee, Berrigan	Federation Council	Lockhart, Greater Hume
Moira (Vic)	Indigo (Vic)	Indigo (Vic)

Federation Council is a local government area located in the Murray region of New South Wales, Australia, formed in 2016 from the merger of the Corowa Shire with neighbouring Urana Shire.

The council comprises an area of 5,685 square kilometres (2,195 sq mi) and covers the urban areas of Corowa and Mulwala and the surrounding cropping and pastoral region to the north. It is bounded to the south by the Murray River and the state of Victoria.

At the time of its establishment the council had an estimated population of 12,602.

== Main towns and villages ==
In addition to the main urban centres of Corowa, Urana and Mulwala, localities in the area include Balldale, Boree Creek, Buraja, Coreen, Daysdale, Hopefield, Howlong, Lowesdale, Morundah, Oaklands, Rand, Rennie and Savernake.

== Heritage listings ==
The Federation Council has a number of heritage-listed sites, including:

- Corowa Courthouse
- Corowa railway station
- Corowa Flour Mill
- Savernake Station
- Urana Soldiers' Memorial Hall

== Council ==
Federation Council comprise nine councillors elected proportionally as a single ward. All councillors are elected for a fixed four-year term of office.

The interim administrator of the Federation Council was solicitor and former professional rugby league footballer Mike Eden, until elections were held on 9 September 2017.

The former mayor of Federation Council was Patrick Bourke from Urana, who was elected on 26 September 2017.

The current mayor of Federation Council is Cheryl Cook from Howlong, elected on 15 October 2024 at an extraordinary council meeting following the September 2024 council election.

The most recent election was held on 14 September 2024.

== Past councillors ==
=== 2017−present ===
Year	Councillor	Councillor	Councillor	Councillor	Councillor	Councillor	Councillor	Councillor	Councillor
2017	Shaun Whitechurch (Ind.)	Patrick Bourke (Ind.)	David Longley (Ind.)	Paul Miegel (Ind.)	Fred Longmire (Ind.)	Bronwyn Thomas (Ind.)	Gail Law (Ind.)	Norm Wales (Ind.)	Andrew Kennedy (Ind.)
2021	Shaun Whitechurch (Ind.)	Patrick Bourke (Ind.)	David Longley (Ind.)	David Fahey (Ind.)	Aaron Nicholls (Ind.)	Sally Hughes (FFF/Ind.)	Gail Law (Ind.)	Rowena Black (Ind.)	Andrew Kennedy (Ind.)
2024	Shaun Whitechurch (Ind.)	Patrick Bourke (Ind.)	David Longley (Ind.)	David Fahey (Ind.)	Aaron Nicholls (Ind.)	Sally Hughes (FFF/Ind.)	Gail Law (Ind.)	Rowena Black (Ind.)	Andrew Kennedy (Ind.)

== Election results ==
=== 2024 ===
2024 New South Wales local elections: Federation
Party	Candidate	Votes	%	±%
Howlong First	1. Cheryl Cook (elected 1); 2. Susan Wearne (elected 8); 3. Michael Gardiner; 4. Damien Glass; 5. David Longley	1,419	19.0	
Independent	1. Andrew Kennedy (elected 2); 2. Chanade Seiler; 3. Nathan Parker; 4. Robert Purtle; 5. Nicole Urquhart	1,009	13.5	−1.6
Independent	1. Derek Schoen (elected 3); 2. Michael Robson; 3. Melanie Trevethan; 4. Matthew Mahon; 5. Theresea Hughes	924	12.3	
Independent	David Bott (elected 4)	762	10.2	
Independent	1. Richard Nixon (elected 6); 2. Robert Pearce; 3. Rowley Bennett; 4. Rosie Dye; 5. Susan Curran	649	8.7	
Independent	1. David Harrison (elected 7); 2. Ray McLarty; 3. Julianne Whyte; 4. Dean Druce; 5. John Crothers	613	8.2	+4.8
Independent	Rowena Black (elected 5)	604	8.1	+1.4
Independent	1. Patrick Bourke (elected 9); 2. David Fahey; 3. Leeanne Dalitz; 4. John Doyle; 5. Mareeta Corcoran	579	7.7	−14.1
Independent	1. Shaun Whitechurch; 2. Norman Wales; 3. Daniel Webb; 4. Brooke Ollington; 5. Katrina Whitechurch	455	6.1	−4.5
Independent	Sally Hughes	303	4.1	−5.3
Independent	Frederick Longmire	168	2.2	
Ind. Socialist Alliance	Todd Beaton	4	0.1	
Total formal votes		7,489	93.5	−0.5
Informal votes		522	6.5	+0.5
Turnout		8,011	80.4	+0.8

=== 2021 ===
Elected councillor	Party
Patrick Bourke	Independent (Group A)
David Fahey	Independent (Group A)
Andrew Kennedy	Independent (Group C)
Aaron Nicholls	Independent (Group E)
Shaun Whitechurch	Independent (Group D)
Sally Hughes	Independent (Group B)
David Longley	Independent
Rowena Black	Independent
Gail Law	Independent

2021 New South Wales local elections: Federation
Party	Candidate	Votes	%	±%
Independent (Group A)		1,616	21.8	
Independent (Group C)		1,117	15.1	
Independent (Group E)		932	12.6	
Independent	David Longley	873	11.8	
Independent (Group D)		785	10.6	
Independent (Group B)		699	9.4	
Independent	Rowena Black	497	6.7	
Independent	Gail Law	280	3.8	
Independent	David Harrison	251	3.4	
Independent	Janette Outram	249	3.4	
Independent	Mick Robson	103	1.4	
Total formal votes		7,402	94.0	
Informal votes		1,780	6.0	
Turnout		7,877	79.6	

== History ==
The Federation Council was created by the Government of New South Wales as a result of an amalgamation of some local government bodies through a reform program between 2013 and 2016. As part of the review, all New South Wales local government authorities were assessed by the NSW Independent Pricing and Regulatory Tribunal on their historical and projected demographic data, financial sustainability, and other measures including their impact on the State's resources. Those council deemed "unfit" were asked to nominate their preferred merger partner in order to achieve economies of scale. Corowa and Urana shires both nominated to merge with each other. In addition Lockhart Shire nominated Urana Shire as a preferred merger partner. In December 2015, the Minister for Local Government Paul Toole proposed the amalgamation of all three Councils. All three Councils opposed the proposal and a group of residents in the town of Mulwala in Corowa Shire threatened to secede and join Berrigan Shire if the three-way merger went ahead. Corowa Shire put forward the alternate proposal being a merger of Corowa and Urana shires, despite objections from Urana Shire. The Minister accepted the Corowa and Urana merger proposal and the Federation Council was proclaimed on 12 May 2016.

== See also ==
- Local government areas of New South Wales
