= Blake Pavey =

Australian comedian, actor and social media personality

- Born: 31 January 2002 (age 24)

Comedy career
- Medium: Social media, stand-up

Blake Pavey (born 31 January 2002) is an Australian comedian, actor and internet personality. Pavey completed his secondary education at Corowa High School. He initially came to prominence on social media, particularly TikTok. He now performs live stand up comedy shows across Australia, New Zealand and the United Kingdom. Pavey has cystic fibrosis, from which he is terminally ill. Pavey was diagnosed at six weeks of age and requires a significant amount of medication in order to treat his condition. His comedy tours, Literally Dying, "Still Kickin' and "A Bit Scared" have focused on making self deprecating jokes about himself and his terminal illness.

== Early life ==
He was born and raised in Corowa, a town in rural New South Wales. At six weeks of age he was diagnosed with cystic fibrosis.

In 2016, Pavey was granted a wish with the Make-A-Wish foundation and was taken to meet John Cena, who Pavey cites as an early role model. He completed his secondary education at Corowa High School, where he was school captain.

== See also ==
- Jordan Shanks
- WWE
- ABC3
- Triple J
- Prank Patrol
