= Corowa Flour Mill =

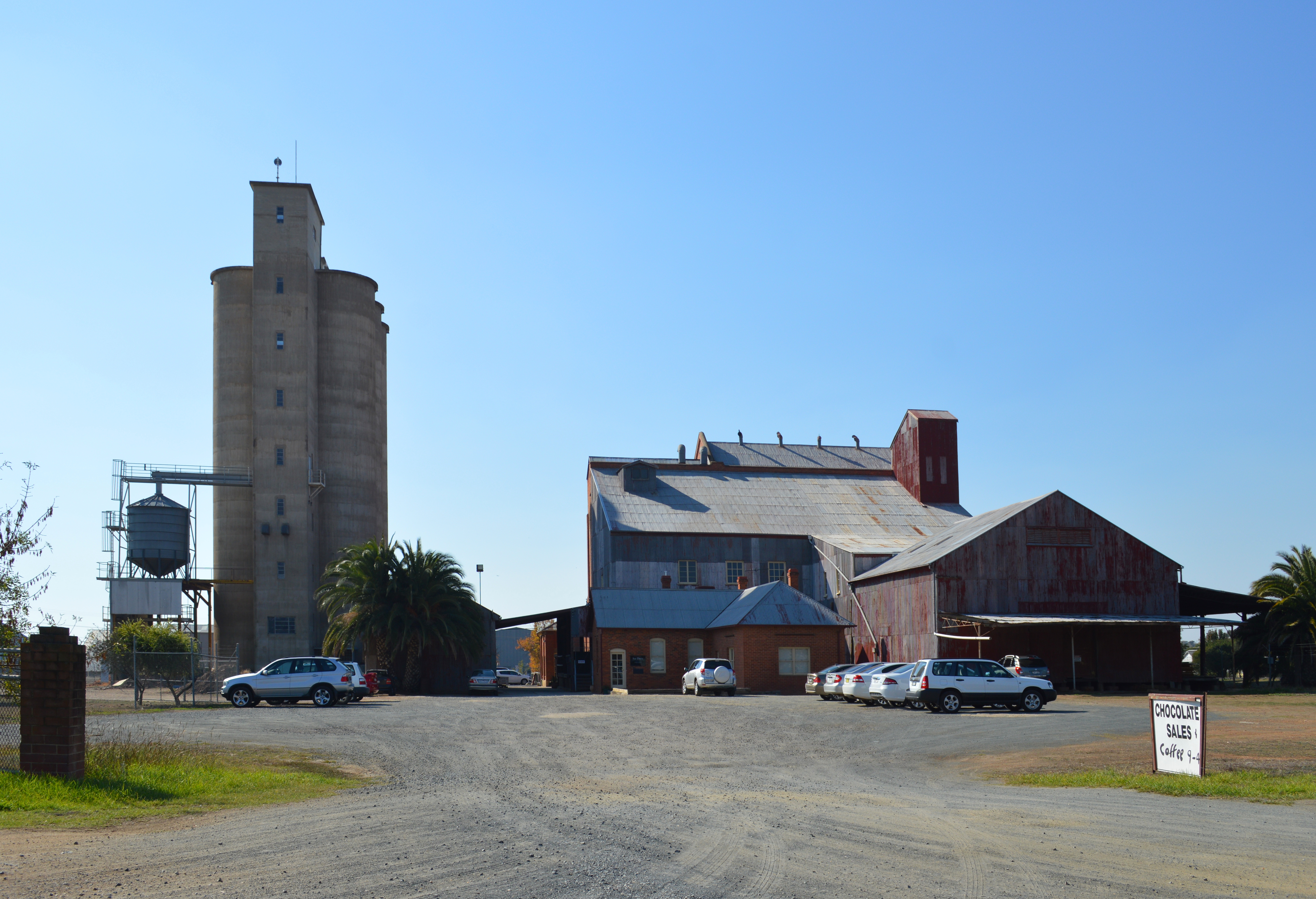
- Chocolate factory operating from the old Corowa Flour Mill, 2013

- Location within New South Wales Location within Australia
- 35°59′27″S 146°23′29″E
- Location: Steel Street, Corowa, Federation Council, New South Wales, Australia

New South Wales Heritage Register
- Official name: Corowa Flour Mill and site
- Type: State heritage (built)
- Designated: 2 April 1999
- Reference no.: 566
- Type: Flour Mill
- Category: Manufacturing and Processing

The Corowa Flour Mill is a heritage-listed former flour mill and now tourist attraction at Steel Street, Corowa, in the Riverina region of New South Wales, Australia. It is also known as the Corowa Flour Mill and site. It was added to the New South Wales State Heritage Register on 2 April 1999.

== History ==
First explored by Charles Sturt in 1838, the Corowa-Wahgunyah area was rapidly taken up as squatting runs. The most influential settler was John Foord, son of a well-known Parramatta coach-builder, who was attracted by the district when he was overlanding cattle from the Monaro to Victoria in 1839 and immediately returned to take up 12,000 hectares (30,000 acres), straddling the Murray River.

Agriculture, with wheat and tobacco, developed and the gold rushes of the 1850s (including one at Corowa) created a new, significant market. Foord was encouraged in 1856 to lay out a private town on the Victorian side of the river, called Wahgunyah, and in 1857 he bought Henry Hopwood's Echuca punt when Hopwood built his pontoon bridge there. The punt was installed at Wahgunyah but was replaced in 1863 by a privately owned wooden toll-bridge operated by a company headed by John Foord.

The bridge was decisive in encouraging urban development on the New South Wales side, where North Wahgunyah, Foord's second private town, became Corowa. The customs houses at the Corowa bridge handled large amounts of wool and the wheat and oats crops were very substantial in the last quarter of the nineteenth century.

Corowa has been an important centre for grain growing since the 1870s. In 1887 a Roller Flour Milling company was formed in Corowa. This mill, subsequently known as the Netherby Roller Flour Mills, was burnt down in 1920. It was replaced by the current structures. The new four storey brick mill building housed fourteen stands of double steel roller mills, with six silo bins providing storage capacity of 550,000 litres (15,000 imp bsh) in the adjoining skillion roof section. Other new buildings were a brick office and boiler house.

The architect of the mill is unknown. However, it is remarkably similar in detail to the mill building in Albury and was probably executed by the same designer and builder.

The old boiler house was replaced after the fire with a similar brick building said to have housed a 130-kilowatt (180 hp) gas engine instead of steam boilers and pumps. Although the motive power had changed, it is evident that the mechanical power transfer system of line-shafting with flat belt drives continued to be in use up until the mill closed in 1970.

The milling company exported flour to the U.K. Malaya, Borneo, Indonesia, the Middle East and North Africa through Aden. It also supplied a large domestic market. In the 1950s the mill was processing three tons of flour per hour and a block of concrete silos were built to provide grain storage for this large output.

In the years after the closure of the mill in 1970 the milling machinery was removed. In the late 1980s the site was purchased by Bunges, a South American-based company of millers who operate the flour mill in Albury with the intention of extending their stock and grain milling operations to the Corowa Mill building.

In 2001, the Corowa Council bought the mill from Goodman Fielder in relation to a planned water works project. Several proposals were made as to what to do with the site over a number of years, but it remained vacant. In 2010, a whisky and chocolate factory, Corowa Whisky and Chocolate, commenced out of the former flour mill.

== Description ==
The complex of mill buildings of heritage significance occupies the southern corner of a very large site. Steel Street runs along the south-west boundary and the railway along the south-east boundary of the site. There is an area of vacant land across the front of Steel Street, along the railway side and to the rear. there is a space of at least ten metres between the mill and the concrete silos to the north-west. All the other buildings on the site are to the north and east. The mill is constructed in the local apricot coloured brick. The modern additions for grain storage are well away from the old buildings and two relatively modern extensions are in a reasonably sympathetic style. One is a gable roofed, galvanised iron clad building attached to the side of the skillion, probably used as a workshop or bagging floor. The other is a hip roofed extension to the small gable roofed brick office building next to the skillion.

The small office building is on the west corner of the complex.

=== Modifications and dates ===
- 1940s or 50s – addition of two buildings for grain storage
- 1970 – the mill closed. In the years after the closure the machinery was removed.
- Late 1980s – the site was purchased by Bunges, a South American-based company of millers who operate the flour mill in Albury with the intention of extending their stock and grain milling operations to the Corowa Mill building.
- 2001 – Council bought the mill off Goodman Fielder as part of a land acquisition project related to a new water works.
- 2002 – Council considered proposals for a national flour museum and bakery on the site, with pre-1930s machinery to be installed. Nothing came of this proposal.
- 7/2009 – proposals for Second Hand Market and Arts Centre and/or a possible chocolate factory, depending on who the site was sold to
- 2010 – Chocolate and whisky factory opens in the building

== Heritage listing ==
As at 1 July 2004, the former Corowa Flour Mill was acknowledged as a landmark in the district. The main building is of considerable architectural and industrial significance although not the only example of such a mill still extant, it is nevertheless considered to be of state heritage significance.

Corowa Flour Mill was listed on the New South Wales State Heritage Register on 2 April 1999.
