= Frank Anderson (footballer, born 1916) =

Australian rules footballer (1916–1971)

Personal information
- Full name: Francis Patrick Anderson
- Born: 2 May 1916; Corowa, New South Wales
- Died: 29 January 1971 (aged 54); Fitzroy, Victoria
- Original teams: Balldale, Camberwell
- Height: 173 cm (5 ft 8 in)
- Weight: 77 kg (170 lb)

Playing career^{1}
Years	Club	Games (Goals)
1938–1941, 1946	Camberwell	73 (?)
1942, 1944	North Melbourne	8 (5)
- ^{1} Playing statistics correct to the end of 1944.

Francis Patrick Anderson (2 May 1916 – 29 January 1971) was an Australian rules footballer who played with North Melbourne in the Victorian Football League (VFL).

Anderson won the Balldale FC best and fairest award in 1935 and again in 1937 too.

Anderson made his VFL senior football debut for North Melbourne against Footscray on Saturday, 27 June 1942, round eight after getting a transfer from the Camberwell Football Club. Anderson played seven games in 1942, then played one game against Collingwood in round twelve, 1944, when he was on leave from active service.

Anderson was a member of Camberwell's losing 1946 grand final team that lost to Sandringham.

Anderson was the younger brother of former St.Kilda and West Perth footballer, Jack Anderson.
