= Corowa railway station =

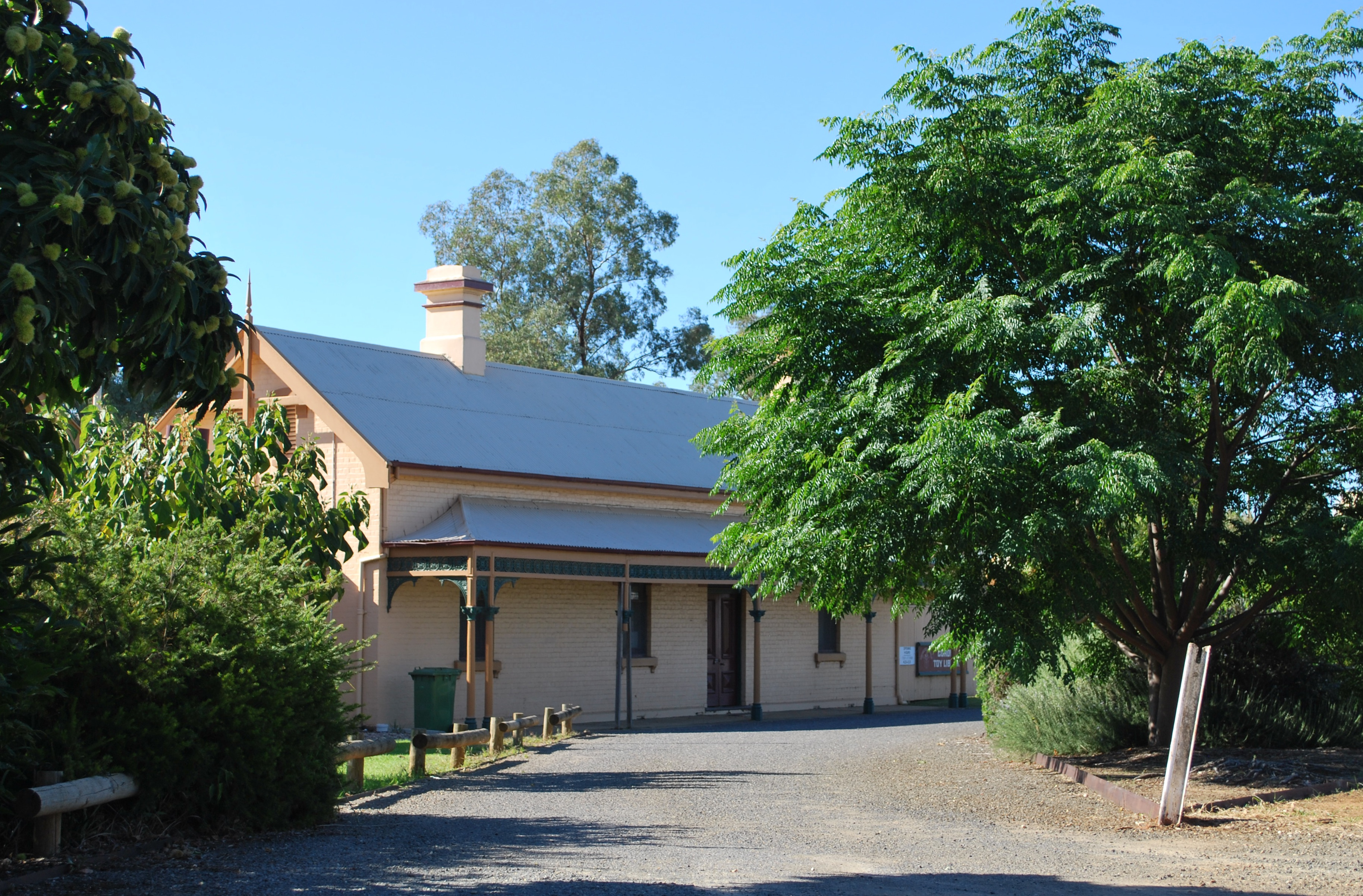
- Corowa railway station, 2011

- Location within New South Wales Location within Australia
- 35°59′38″S 146°23′19″E
- Location: Culcairn-Corowa line, Corowa, Federation Council, New South Wales, Australia

History
- Built: 1892

Site notes
- Owner: Transport Asset Manager of New South Wales

New South Wales Heritage Register
- Official name: Corowa Railway Station and yard group
- Type: State heritage (complex / group)
- Designated: 2 April 1999
- Reference no.: 1120
- Type: Railway Platform/Station
- Category: Transport – Rail

The Corowa railway station is a heritage-listed railway station located on the Culcairn-Corowa line at Corowa, in the Riverina region of New South Wales Australia. It is also known as Corowa Railway Station and yard group. The property was added to the New South Wales State Heritage Register on 2 April 1999.

== History ==
First explored by Charles Sturt in 1838, the Corowa-Wahgunyah area was rapidly taken up as squatting runs. The most influential settler was John Foord, son of a well-known Parramatta coach-builder, who was attracted by the district when he was overlanding cattle from the Monaro to Victoria in 1839 and immediately returned to take up 12,000 hectares (30,000 acres), straddling the Murray River.

Agriculture, with wheat and tobacco, developed and the gold rushes of the 1850s (including one at Corowa) created a new, significant market. Foord was encouraged in 1856 to lay out a private town on the Victorian side of the river, called Wahgunyah, and in 1857 he bought Henry Hopwood's Echuca punt when Hopwood built his pontoon bridge there. The punt was installed at Wahgunyah but was replaced in 1863 by a privately owned wooden toll-bridge operated by a company headed by John Foord.

The bridge was decisive in encouraging urban development on the New South Wales side, where North Wahgunyah, Foord's second private town, became Corowa. The customs houses at the Corowa bridge handled large amounts of wool and the wheat and oats crops were very substantial in the last quarter of the nineteenth century.

== Description ==
The complete comprises a type 4 station building of standard roadside brick, built in 1892. Other structures include a brick platform face, also completed in 1892; a water column; and a water tank.

== Heritage listing ==
Corowa is an excellent example of a country terminus site with buildings constructed during the transition phase from early railway construction to the standardisation that took place after the 1888 Railways Act and the Eddy administration which followed. The station building in particular is an excellent example of a small country station which retains its original form and detail where most similar structures have been altered. The adjacent residence (no longer owned by State Rail) adds to the completeness of the site.

The Corowa railway station was listed on the New South Wales State Heritage Register on 2 April 1999 having satisfied the following criteria.

The place possesses uncommon, rare or endangered aspects of the cultural or natural history of New South Wales.

This item is assessed as historically rare. This item is assessed as scientifically rare. This item is assessed as arch. rare. This item is assessed as socially rare.
