= Urana Soldiers' Memorial Hall =

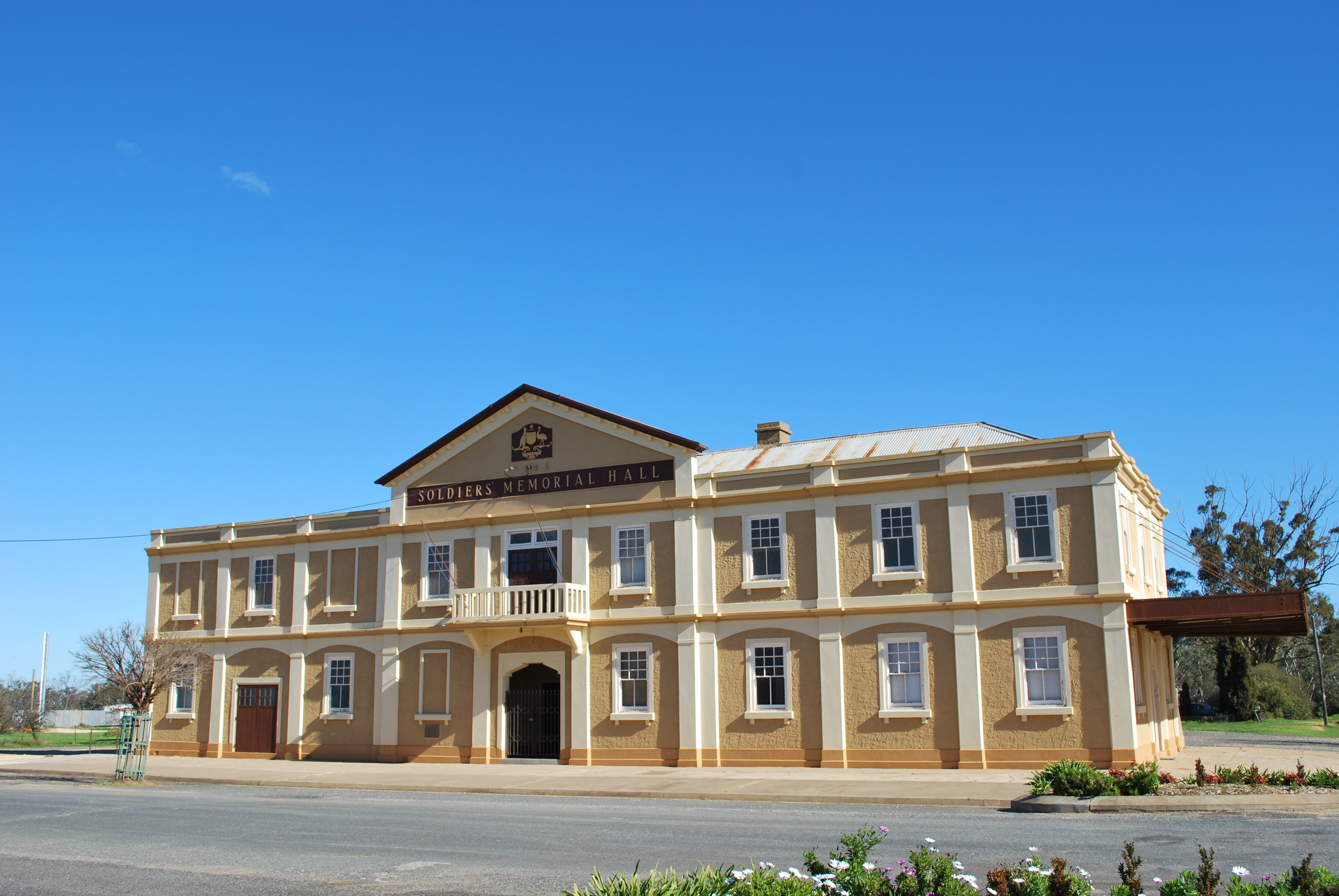

- Location within New South Wales Location within Australia
- 35°19′54″S 146°15′59″E
- Location: Anna Street, Urana, Federation Council, New South Wales, Australia

History
- Built: 1884–1924

Site notes
- Architects: George Sheppard (1884 Mechanics Institute hall); Sidney James Hunnings (1923 second hall and façade)
- Owner: Federation Council

New South Wales Heritage Register
- Official name: Urana Soldiers' Memorial Hall; Soldiers Hall; Mechanics Institute Hall; School of Arts hall
- Type: State heritage (built)
- Designated: 8 April 2016
- Reference no.: 1966
- Type: Memorials
- Category: Monuments and Memorials

The Urana Soldiers' Memorial Hall is a heritage-listed community hall located at Anna Street, Urana, Federation Council, New South Wales, Australia. It was designed by George Sheppard (in 1884 as the Mechanics Institute Hall) and by Sidney James Hunnings (in 1923 as the second hall and façade). The Hall was built between 1884 and 1924. It is also known as the Soldiers Hall, Mechanics Institute Hall and School of Arts Hall. The property is owned by Federation Council. It was added to the New South Wales State Heritage Register on 8 April 2016.

== History ==
=== Aboriginal land ===
The traditional indigenous people of Urana area are the Bangerang people. The Bangerang used the River Murray as a thoroughfare and were famous for their bark canoes. There are large middens along the Murray river, on both banks, composed of black wood-ash and burnt clay from cooking. For the Bangerang the river fulfilled a function as a major highway for communications and trade and as a major source of food. They found plentiful food, shellfish and Murray cod in the river and fruit, tubers and nuts in the adjacent country. Although they probably joined the Wiradjuri and [others] at the annual feast on bogong moths in the alpine peaks each December and January, the Bangerang were less mobile than the highland folk. The dislocation by Europeans of normal Aboriginal routines of life was increasingly severe from the 1840s onwards.

=== Colonisation ===
After initial explorations by Hume and Hovell in 1824, the first settler in the Albury area was Charles Ebden who started working land on both sides of the Murray in 1835. By 1838 the major route south from Gundagai to Port Phillip was established along the line of the later Hume Highway through Albury. A census in 1845 counted 200 people in "Urana in the centre of Bangerang country". By 1850 all desirable water frontages on both sides of the Murray had been taken up. The rivers of the plains north of the Murray in the Urana region also had attractive frontages, though more prone to drought. In the mid-1840s, there were "settlers moving down the Lachlan, Murrumbidgee, Billabong and Murray Rivers", and more moving north from Victoria.

In the 1850s the gold-rush population created a market for beef which encouraged cattle breeding. The big stations on the flat plains were typically partitioned into paddocks and the backblocks more intensively exploited. Urana's Brookong station, which in 1850 had had one paddock covering 45,000 hectares (110,000 acres), by 1871 had twelve paddocks, each of 10,000 hectares (25,000 acres), divided by wire fences. In the 1860s cattle disease and low prices for beef led pastoralists to concentrate more on sheep, and fine Merino wool became a dominant product. With a vigorous steamboat trade on the Murray from the 1850s and a rail link to Melbourne via Echuca, the wool clip was assured of easy transport to its markets. With closer settlement in the period from 1870 onwards, grain production became increasingly important. The last quarter of the nineteenth century saw an increase in the number of pastoralists, a reduction in the general size of holdings, the increased sinking of deep wells to water backblocks and a complementary increase in the population of the service towns throughout the region.

Between 1860 and 1890 the population of the region increased by 600% and the towns took their municipal shape. Albury, the senior and always most important town, was surveyed in 1838 and gazetted in the following year. Urana developed in the mid-1860s as a crossroads on drove routes, converging from Corowa to the south, Jerilderie to the west, Narrandera to the north and Wagga Wagga to the northeast. The towns served agricultural farms and grazing properties and prospered from meeting their needs. By the mid twentieth century, irrigation channels to assist farmers on the drier lands in the west have both increased wool production and diversified cropping, although with a heavy price to pay in increasing salination around the Wakool.

=== Urana Mechanics Institute ===
The original (northern) hall in the Urana Soldier's Memorial Hall was built for the "Mechanics Institute and School of Arts" for Urana in the early 1880s in order to provide educational opportunities for working-class men. It was instigated by local citizens who raised funding by private subscription which was then matched by government funding (although there were grumbles that the government was stinting on its share by only offering 10 shillings for each pound raised instead of pound for pound (Australian Town and Country Journal, 28/6/1884)). A meeting of subscribers held at the Urana Hotel on 28 November 1883 resolved to "instruct Mr. Sheppard, Architect, of Wagga, to prepare plans and specifications for a brick hall 70 feet (21 m) long, 30 feet (9.1 m) wide, and 15 feet (4.6 m) high".

The foundation stone for the School of Arts and Mechanics' Institute hall, Urana was laid on 27 May 1884, by Mrs. Newton, of Urana station, who was presented with a "handsome silver trowel". The cost of the building was expected to surpass A£1,000.

'Schools of Arts, Mechanics' Institutes and Literary Institutes were an integral part of the early fabric of Australia society. Nearly every country town had its School of Arts and many still exist under different names reflecting their continuing role as centres of community activity. . . Following the establishment of the first Mechanics' Institute in Hobart in 1827, the movement spread rapidly bringing wider education, culture, art and literature to communities throughout Australia. . . Our public libraries, adult education, and technical education all had their beginnings in the movement. . . Most towns and small settlements at some time had an equivalent of a School of Arts. Though some may now serve a different purpose, many of these buildings remain still providing a focal point for community activities.'

'They sought to give skilled working men education for life and work, providing lectures, classes, libraries and even museums. . . Most mechanics' institutes failed in their educational aims . . . While institute buildings have survived, sometimes as community centres or libraries, the worthy ideals of the founders – self-improvement, self-discipline, class co-operation and cultural egalitarianism – have long been forgotten.

=== World War I and its aftermath ===
Australians served overseas in several British Empire wars during the nineteenth century including the Boxer Rebellion, the Sudan War and the Boer War. However it was Australia's experience of World War I between 1914 and 1918 which most profoundly affected Australian identity. Throughout Australia, a large proportion of young men signed up to fight for King and Empire following the declaration of war on 4 August 1914. Newspaper editorials and readers' contributions in the form of letters and poems called upon young men to support the cause, parades were held, patriotic associations formed and appeals for money were received enthusiastically. .

A large proportion of these young men who went off to fight in Europe and the Middle East never came home, and of those who returned an even larger proportion were seriously injured in mind and / or body. As the Australian War Memorial website explains: 'For Australia, as for many nations, the First World War remains the most costly conflict in terms of deaths and casualties. From a population of fewer than five million, 416,809 men enlisted, of which over 60,000 were killed and 156,000 wounded, gassed, or taken prisoner.'

Following World War I, war memorials were erected throughout Australia as an expression of grief for those lost and of gratitude to those who served. These memorials were not a short lived emotion but an enduring expression of respect which remain prominent throughout the Australian built environment. Some memorials took years to eventuate as communities organised themselves, raised funds and debated what to build. Community halls were a popular form of memorial and communities would often rally to build a school of arts building as a memorial while some with existing halls frequently added commemorative plaques bearing a roll of honour.

=== Urana Soldiers Memorial Hall ===
The foundation stone for the memorial hall was laid by Mr. Otway Falkiner, who was presented with an address of welcome and a silver trowel. There was a large assemblage at Urana to witness the laying of the foundation stone of the Urana Soldiers' Memorial Hall. The building will provide a large dancing hall, stage, dressing room, supper-room, kitchen, library, reading room, committee room, sample room, and soldiers' club room. 'It is some years since the Memorial Hall Committee began operations and with Mr. F. E. Whitehead, J.P. as the president of the committee; Mr. L. S. Chandler, as treasurer, and Mr. J. Trainor as secretary. Many difficulties were overcome.'

'The building is expected to cost 4000 pounds, of which 2500 pounds in already in hand. The hall will be built of reinforced concrete, and will be of two floors, containing a 72 ft [21.9m] by 40 ft. [12.2m] hall on the ground floor, dressing, cloak, supper looms, etc.; the second floor will be occupied by the billiard room and soldiers' club room.' (Riverina Grazier, 13/11/1923, p1). An electric lighting plant was installed in 1925 at a cost of 560 pounds. Installation of electricity would have also made possible the use of the hall as a cinema.

The 1920s design was prepared by the shire's engineer, Sidney James Hunnings, himself an Australian army ex-serviceman (Albury and Wodonga Express, 9 November 1923 p47; NAA).

'The building is notable for its combination of two halls. . . the School of Arts hall built in 1884 . . . combined with a new hall in 1923–4. The combined halls were faced with an interwar Georgian Revival style frontage. The whole frontage . . . is constructed of in situ poured concrete. This is an early and unusual use of concrete . . . It is a precursor to later use of concrete (tilt slab) as a wall construction method for large buildings.'. The National Archives service records for S.J. Hunnings show that during his time in the army he invented a "method of petrifying surfaces of aerodromes and roads", suggesting that he was interested in innovative design (NAA 'Hunnings').

The hall was officially opened on 22 May 1925: "Before a large gathering Senator General Chas. Cox officially opened the Urana Soldiers" Memorial Hall. In an inspiring address the speaker referred in glowing terms to the bravery of our soldiers and said that the Australian army was the only voluntary army in the world. That was one thing they were proud of.'

"Urana Soldiers Memorial Hall represents the large number of men that enlisted in World War I from the Urana area. The AIF project database establishes the following:

- Urana: 45 enlisted, 1 killed in action, 4 died of wounds
- Oaklands: 64 enlisted, 6 killed in action, 7 died of wounds, 3 died of diseases
- Boree Creek: 36 enlisted, 5 killed in action, 2 died of diseases
- Morundah: 4 enlisted.

One newspaper article of the time noted, "provision is being made in the hall for a room wherein they may meet and have their gatherings and keep their things. This is as it should be".

'Strangers passing through the town are greatly impressed with the imposing appearance of the Urana Soldiers' Memorial Hall.'

A local newspaper report described the continuing use of the hall when it was the scene of 'Urana's Grand Welcome Home to Servicemen and Servicewomen' on Victory Night (10 June 1946). The article recorded the content of the main speeches and the names of the deceased, whose relatives had been presented with certificates. (Lockhart Review and Oakland Advertiser, 18 June 1946, accessed on Trove)

A small room at the rear of the second hall with historic movie projecting equipment provides evidence that the hall was used for screening movies. The use of memorial and community halls for the screening of movies was probably a widespread phenomena in NSW, however there has been no systematic documentation or survey of historic cinemas in NSW. A recent survey of regional cinemas in Victorian identified "170 places where moving pictures were shown on a regular basis", many of which were "public halls. . . built as memorials to those who served in the First and the Second World Wars.".

In 2015 at the time of listing, the hall is owned by Urana Shire Council and in occasional community use.

George Sheppard (1853–1918)

George Sheppard, architect and surveyor, designed the original hall in 1884. He was born in Suffolk England and migrated to Wagga Wagga with his wife in 1875. Employed as the municipal surveyor, he was also an accomplished architect who undertook private commissions. He designed some 40 schools throughout the Riverina for the NSW Council of Education. Sheppard's other works include Mt Erin, the Murrumbidgee Co-operative Flour Mill, and the "Big Springs" and "Eunonyhareenyha" homesteads.

S.J. Hunnings (1882–1961)

Sidney James Hunnings was the Urana Shire engineer when he prepared the architectural plans and specifications for the Urana Soldiers memorial Hall in 1922. Born in London, he had served in the Australian army (Albury Wodonga Express, 9/11/1923, p47; Service Number 2870, Australian Archives). In 1925, soon after the Urana hall was completed, he and his wife Isabel were farewelled by 'a large and representative fathering of townspeople assembled at the Urana Soldier's Memorial Hall' on their departure to Crookwell, where he had accepted the position of shire engineer. During his time at Urana he had designed a number of concrete bridges. The couple had been involved in many community groups and one newspaper article commented, "It will be hard to name another couple who have done so much for the town during the past six years than Mr. and Mrs. Hunnings". He went on to serve for 11.5 years as shire engineer at Gundagai, 5.5 years as shire engineer at Burwood, then attempted a short stint as consulting engineer "but lack of materials and supply difficulties made such a position precarious at the time" so in 1947 at the age of 65 he applied for and was re-employed in his previous position as shire engineer at Gundagai (Cootamundra Herald, 18/3/1947, p1). He died in Albury in 1961. (NSW Registry of Births Deaths & Marriages).

=== Comparisons ===
World War I memorial halls were community projects that were widespread across NSW as a heartfelt response to the unexpected toll of suffering and death endured by local communities as a result of losing so many young men to World War I. A sample of Australian memorial halls submitted by the nominator indicated that these halls tended to be one of two main types: simple, shed-like structures in small localities, often in a Gothic style; and large brick structures in large towns, often in Neo-classical, Art Deco or Arts and Crafts style. Urana's hall is a remarkable exception to the prevailing pattern, where one of the smallest communities built one of the largest memorial halls. The unusual architectural result is a Neoclassical facade of monumental size that dwarfs the surrounding townscape. The use of such a large frontage to cover two combined halls appears to be unique in NSW

A Victorian survey of country cinemas reported that early cinema equipment "rarely survive . . . perhaps the best collection is at the Rex, Charlton". In NSW, intact historic cinema equipment has been reported at the Avoca Picture Theatre on the Central Coast, the Roxy at Leeton, the Bodalla Hall, the AmuseU Cinema in Manildra, the Mendooran Mechanics Institute, the Savoy Theatre Connabarabran, the Liberty Cinema, Collarenebri, the Montreal Cinema in Tumut, the Narooma cinema, the Sawtell cinema, the Bowraville Theatre and the James Theatre Dungog (whose equipment is held by the Dungog Museum).

== Description ==
The township of Urana is located in the Riverina district of south western NSW, west of Wagga Wagga on the road to Jerilderie, about 561 kilometres (349 mi) southwest of the state capital, Sydney. It is the largest centre in the Urana Shire local government area, which in 2011 had a shire-wide population of just 553 people.

In Regional Histories of NSW, Urana forms part of the "Murray" region which includes those districts that drain to the Murray River below the mountains of the Kosciusko range.

The proposed curtilage forms a boundary around two lots enclosing an area 1,840 square metres (19,800 sq ft) facing Anna Street on which the building is sited.

The building is composed of two brick halls, each with a corrugated galvanised steel roof, collectively fronted by a grand two-storey facade constructed in poured concrete in the "Interwar Georgian Revival" style.

The in-situ poured concrete construction was innovative for its day. According to the shire's heritage advisor, Dr Peter Kabaila, 'this was an early and unusual use of concrete. It is a precursor to later use of concrete (tilt slab) as a wall construction method for large buildings.'

The first hall was built for the Urana Mechanics Institute and School of Arts in 1884. This finely proportioned room (21.2m long, 9.1m wide, 4.6m high), with its painted brick walls and timber floor and ceiling, has a distinctive barrel shaped roof, supported by exposed steel trusses. A second brick hall (21.9m long x 12.2m wide) was built in 1923-4 along with the combined concrete facade as a memorial to the men from the district who had lost their lives in World War I. The second hall is larger than the original hall, with a timber floor and gyprock walls and ceiling, and a stage area on the northern end. There are two large rooms on the first floor between the concrete facade and the halls, neither is in use in 2015. One of these, between the concrete facade and the original School of Arts hall, has been used as a shopfront. The space between the two halls has been infilled with a kitchen. Men's and women's toilets have been included in an addition to the north-west of the 1920s hall.

A collection of moveable heritage has been catalogued, including early photographs, honour boards, a large wooden table and crockery with insignia. The site also retains historic film projecting equipment from when the 1920s hall functioned as the town cinema. The building is substantially intact, both internally and externally.

There is a memorial avenue of trees nearby in Stephen Street, mature date palms (Phoenix canariensis) which were planted in the 1920s using seeds which soldiers brought back from the Middle East.

=== Modifications and dates ===
- 1884: The original hall for the Urana Mechanics Institute and School of Arts was constructed, funded by private subscription with matched government funding.
- 1891: An additional room 5 metres x 6 metres under a skillion roof was added at the rear of the original hall rear in 1891, probably to provide a service room.
- 1923–24: Following some 8 years of fund-raising the original Mechanics Institute hall was combined with a second hall and together they were fronted with a grand poured concrete façade and renamed the Urana Soldiers Memorial Hall in honour of local servicemen.
- 1954: The exterior of the building was painted greatly improving its appearance. There were extensive alterations and additions to the kitchen of the supper room, making it "very modern". The estimated total cost including electrical installations and appliances was £1,000. There was also a proposal to erect Honour Rolls for World War II soldiers and to refurbish those previously made for World War I soldiers. Also at this time the area at the back of the hall was enclosed with a new galvanised iron fence. The ticket box was removed from the main entrance which then housed the honour rolls.

== Heritage listing ==
As at 9 September 2015, the Urana Soldiers Memorial Hall, dating from 1884 and 1924, is of state aesthetic and rarity significance for its monumental scale within a modest urban setting. The item has state historical significance for its demonstration of a major investment by a tiny community in commemorating the large proportion of its citizens who enlisted in World War I. The Urana Soldiers' Memorial Hall is of state representative significance for its memorial function designed to permanently commemorate the local men who lost their lives in World War I. Its status as a war memorial represents the importance of "remembrance" in Australian culture. The hall also has representative significance as a high quality regional hall used for social and cultural events that draw the community together, including its years of functioning as the local cinema. The older of its two halls, the Mechanics Institute hall dating from 1884, has fine proportions and retains intact architectural detailing including the barrel vaulted ceiling with exposed trusses.

Urana Soldiers' Memorial Hall was listed on the New South Wales State Heritage Register on 8 April 2016 having satisfied the following criteria.

The place is important in demonstrating the course, or pattern, of cultural or natural history in New South Wales.

The Urana Soldiers' Memorial Hall is of state historical significance for its demonstration of a major investment by a tiny community in commemorating the large proportion of its citizens who enlisted in World War I, especially those who never returned.

The place is important in demonstrating aesthetic characteristics and/or a high degree of creative or technical achievement in New South Wales.

The Urana Soldiers' Memorial Hall is of state aesthetic significance as a dominant, landmark building set in the urban landscape of a small town. The 1884 Mechanics Institute hall has fine proportions and retains intact architectural detailing including the barrel vaulted ceiling with exposed steel trusses. The building facade has technical significance as an innovative use of tilt slab concrete wall construction.

The place has potential to yield information that will contribute to an understanding of the cultural or natural history of New South Wales.

The Urana Soldiers' Memorial Hall is of state research significance for the technically innovative use of tilt slab concrete wall construction in its facade.

The place possesses uncommon, rare or endangered aspects of the cultural or natural history of New South Wales.

The Urana Soldiers' Memorial Hall is of state significance for the rarity of its monumental scale within a modest urban setting. Of the hundreds of memorial halls built across NSW in the interwar period, most in small towns were modest weatherboard or brick halls in the Art Deco or Gothic style while larger towns tended to build more elaborate brick halls in a Neo-classical, Art Deco or Arts and Crafts style. The Urana Soldiers' Memorial Hall is rare in the state for its monumental scale within its modest town setting. The use of a large facade as a combined front for two halls may be unique in NSW.

The place is important in demonstrating the principal characteristics of a class of cultural or natural places/environments in New South Wales.

The Urana Soldiers Memorial Hall is of state representative significance for its memorial function designed to permanently commemorate the local men who lost their lives in World War I and as a high quality regional community hall. Its commemoration function, extended over time to recognise men who died in later wars is representative of the high level of commitment by local communities in NSW to honouring the young men they lost to war. Its status as a war memorial represents the importance of "remembrance" in Australian culture. The hall is also of representative significance as a community hall used for social and cultural events that draw the community together, including its years of functioning as the local cinema.
