= George Anderson (Australian footballer, born 1885) =

Australian rules footballer

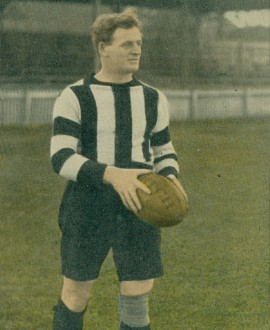
- Anderson during his career

Personal information
- Born: 3 June 1885; Windsor, Victoria
- Died: 19 June 1958 (aged 73); Wagga Wagga
- Original teams: Balldale, Howlong
- Debut: 3 June 1911, Collingwood vs. Melbourne, at Victoria Park
- Height: 168 cm (5 ft 6 in)
- Weight: 80 kg (176 lb)

Playing career^{1}
Years	Club	Games (Goals)
1911–1917	Collingwood	104 (8)
- ^{1} Playing statistics correct to the end of 1917.

Career highlights
- VFL premiership player: 1917

George Power "Geordie" Anderson (3 June 1885 – 19 June 1958) was an Australian rules footballer who played with Collingwood in the Victorian Football League (VFL).

== Family ==
He and his wife, Sarah Ann Anderson (1883–1950), née Carson had three sons and four daughters. He moved to Wagga Wagga from Melbourne in 1919.

== Football ==
Anderson was originally from the Balldale Football Club. Anderson played on the half-back flank for most of his career at Collingwood. He was recruited from the Howlong Football Club in 1911; and, when he first came to Collingwood he was known as "Snowy Martin", due to his similarity to an Essendon player of the same name.

He was unable to play in the first five matches of the 1911 season because his clearance from the New South Wales league was delayed. In the meant time, The Argus was reporting that "Anderson is showing splendid form at practice". He played his first senior game for Collingwood on his 26th birthday (Saturday, 3 June 1911), against Melbourne in round 6 of the 1911 VFL season on the forward line; he kicked one goal. Noting that he was "a player from a rural association", the football correspondent of The Age — who thought that Collingwood full-forward Dick Lee was quite out of form during the match — remarked that "in the want of lofty markers in the forward division [for Collingwood]… Anderson was the most proficient in this department" and, further, asserting that "[Anderson will undoubtedly prove to be a valuable acquisition to his team".

Anderson played on the forward flank in the Collingwood team for the 1911 VFL Grand Final. The Collingwood team, carrying two of its champion players — its full-forward and captain, Dick Lee, and its centre half-forward, Dan Minogue — who had both been badly injured during the match, lost to Essendon by 6 points.

In 1912, his second season, and the first year that VFL players wore numbers on the back of their guernseys, Anderson's guernsey carried the original number one for Collingwood.

Playing on the half-back flank, he was one of the few consistently good players for the Collingwood team that was soundly beaten by Carlton 11.12 (78) to 6.9 (45) in the 1915 VFL Grand Final, on 18 September 1915, in what was considered to be a "fast and furious game".

In 1917, Anderson played on the half-back flank for the Collingwood team that defeated Fitzroy, 9.20 (74) to 5.9 (39), on 22 September 1917, in the 1917 VFL Grand Final. He was one of Collingwood's best players in the Grand Final. The match was the last senior VFL game for him.

== Exhibition team ==
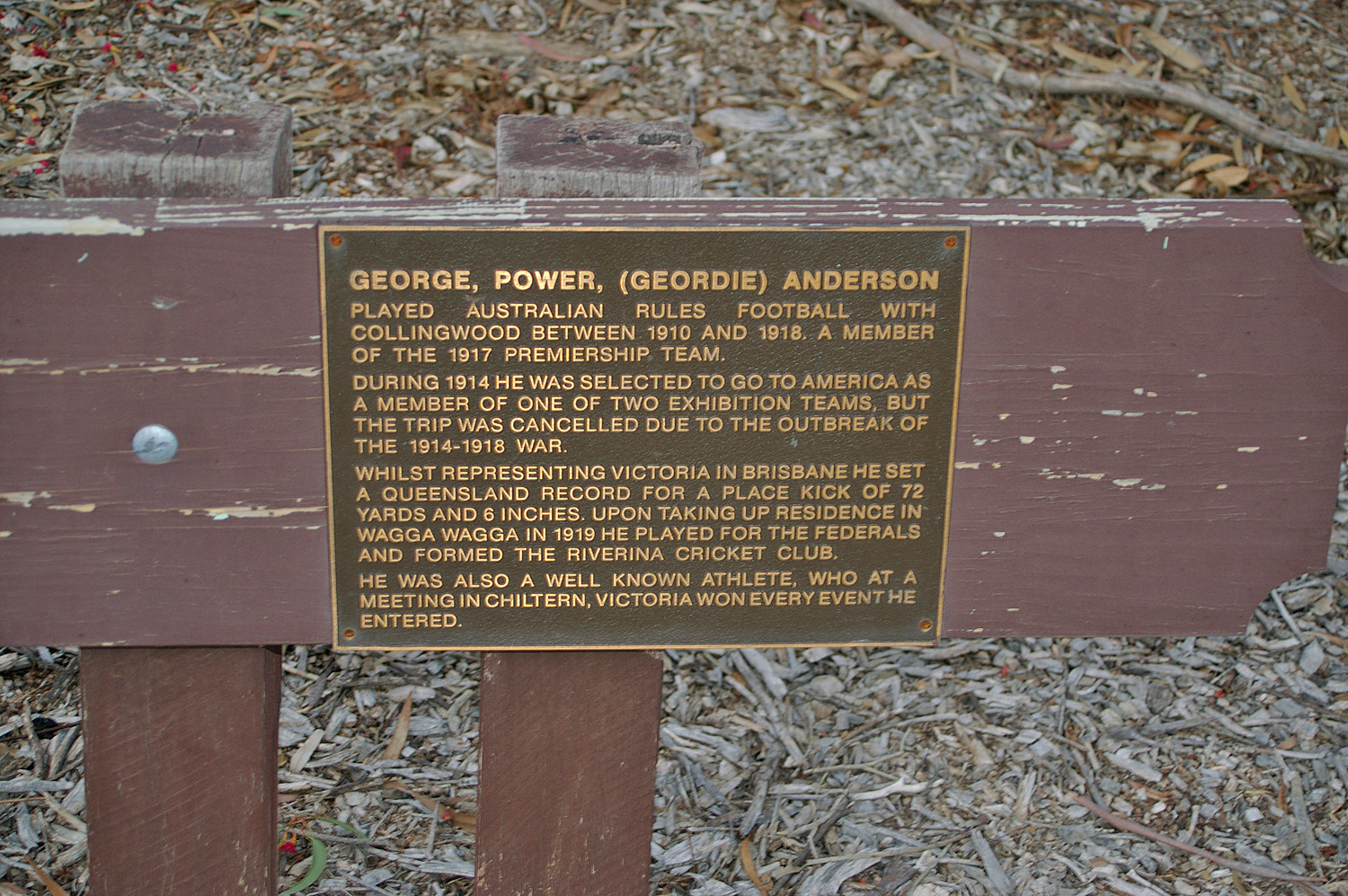
The Memorial Plaque at Anderson Park, Glenfield Road, Mount Austin

In 1914, former St Kilda player, captain, and coach, James Smith, encouraged by the American boxing referee and manager of the major Melbourne boxing venue, Mr Angelo Marre, came up with the notion of taking two teams of Australian rules footballers (all in all, 45 men) to the Panama–California Exposition (scheduled to begin in San Diego, California in March 1915) to demonstrate Australian rules football. He approached the Victorian Football Association for its support; however, the VFA decided to take no further action until it became clear to them precisely who were associated with Smith's proposal. Smith also approached the Australasian Football Council, which gave him permission to take two teams to the Exposition.

By the second half of the year, Smith had formed a company known as The Australian Football Company. The company representatives met with Frederick William Hagelthorn (1864–1943), who was not only the Victorian Minister for Public Works, but was the Victorian Commissioner to the Panama Exposition; they sought a "small subsidy" towards their expenses, whilst at the Exposition, on the basis that "the men would serve as an admirable advertisement for Australia". Hagelthorn's response was that, whilst their endeavour "had his hearty sympathy", he was unable to grant their request. He promised, however, to see if it was possible to subsidize local advertising for the exhibition games.

Anderson was one of the first players chosen for the exhibition teams; however, due to the commencement of the first World War, all of Smith's plans were abandoned, and the proposed exhibition matches never eventuated.

== Wagga Wagga ==
When Anderson moved to Wagga Wagga he played for a time with the Federals Football Club.

== Record ==
An hour before the Collingwood team's scheduled match against South Adelaide (the two teams were representing Victoria and South Australia respectively) — the first match of the Australian Rules Football Carnival, run by the Queensland Football League, under the auspices of the Australasian Football Council, at the Brisbane Cricket Ground, on Saturday 8 August 1914 — Anderson won a goal kicking competition. Using a place kick, he kicked the ball 72 yards 6 inches, which still stands today as a Queensland record for a place kick.

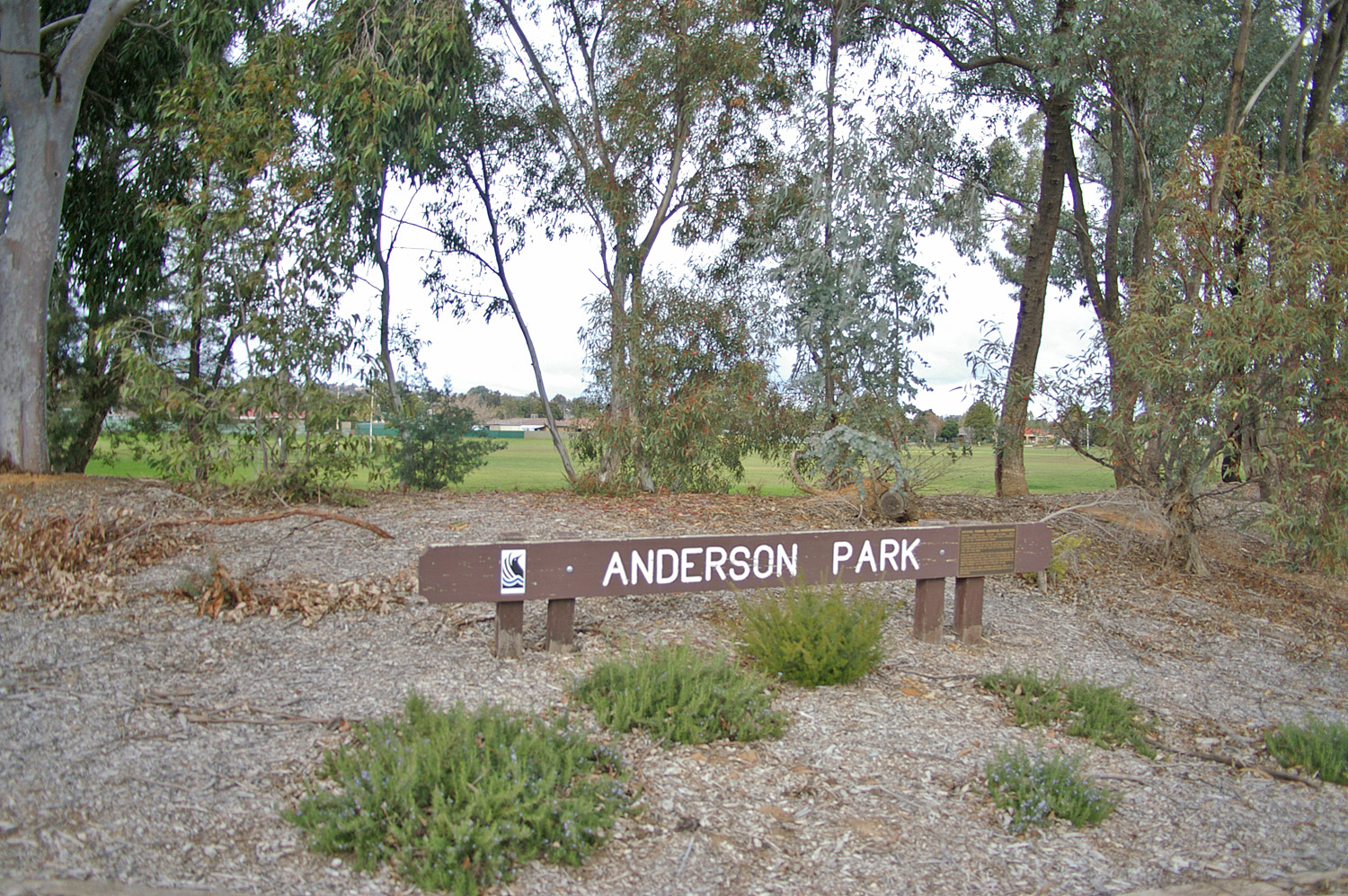
Anderson Park, Glenfield Road, Mount Austin

== The rhyming storekeeper ==
In the area around Wagga Wagga he became renowned for his capacity to write impromptu poems and doggerel verse, on any subject at all, at a moments notice; and was known locally as "the rhyming storekeeper".

== Anderson Park ==
In 1987, the park in Glenfield Road, Mount Austin (a suburb of Wagga Wagga) was named Anderson Park in his honour.
