= Elizabeth Wilmot (physician) =

Australian medical doctor (1912–1998)

Alice Elizabeth (Betty) Wilmot OBE MBBS
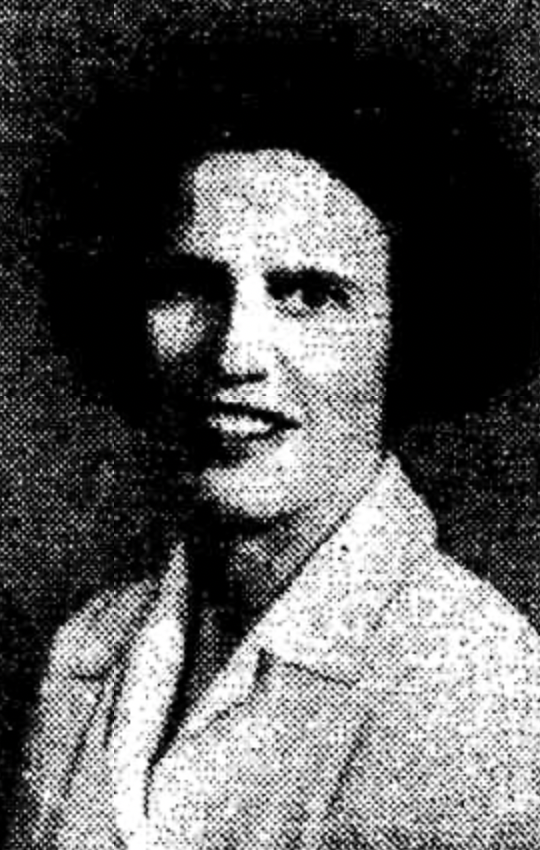
- Born: Alice Elizabeth Wilmot; 15 February 1912
- Died: 4 February 1998 (aged 85)
- Education: University of Melbourne
- Medical career
- Profession: Physician
- Field: Maternal and Child Health

Alice Elizabeth (Betty) Wilmot MBBS OBE (15 February 1912 – 4 February 1998) was an Australian medical administrator and dietician. She had a long and distinguished career dedicated to improving the health and welfare of mothers and children and was appointed an Officer of the Order of the British Empire (OBE) in 1978 in recognition of this work.

== Early life and education ==
Elizabeth Wilmot was born in Corowa, New South Wales in 1912. She graduated with a Bachelor of Science from the University of Melbourne in 1935, obtained a Diploma of Dietetics, and trained at St. Vincent's Hospital in Melbourne. Later, after being awarded a National Medical Research Councill grant, she completed her Bachelor of Medicine and Bachelor of Surgery (MBBS) in 1945, also at the University of Melbourne.

Wilmot was a keen sportswoman, reaching notable levels of achievement in both hockey and tennis.

== Career ==
Wilmot commenced her working life as Dietician to Victorian Railways (1934–1938), driving several public health initiatives while in the role. In 1939, Wilmot joined the Commonwealth Department of Health as a dietician. In 1941 Wilmot joined research staff in the Physiology Department at the University of Melbourne. While working on maternal and child nutrition, she met Dr Vera Scantlebury Brown, and was inspired to return to studies and complete a medical degree. After completing her MBBS, Wilmot was a Resident Medical Officer at the Alfred Hospital, Melbourne (1945–1946), and the Children' s Hospital, Perth (1946–1947), and a Scholar Medical Officer in the School Medical Service in Tasmania (1947–1948).

In 1948, Wilmot was awarded a British Council Scholarship, and travelled to England to obtain a Diploma of Child Health in London (1948–1949). When she returned to Melbourne in 1950, she went on to become assistant director of the Maternal, Infant and Preschool Welfare Branch at the Department of Health, Victoria. In 1960 she became Director of the same branch in the Department of Health in Victoria. This was the position that Dr Vera Scantlebury Brown had held until her death in 1946.

Wilmot was a tireless worker and often held multiple posts. While she was assistant director, she was appointed the World Health Organisation's Regional Advisor in Maternal and Child Heath in the Western Pacific (1953–1955), her office based primarily in Manila, Philippines. In 1966 Wilmot was appointed as a Fellow of the National Health and Medical Research Council. She was appointed Assistant Chief Health Officer of Maternal and Child Health in the Victorian Department of Health from 1967 to 1977, making her the first woman to reach this level of seniority. Wilmot was twice Honorary Secretary of the Australian Federation of Medical Women (1958-1962 and 1968~1971) and throughout her career she served on the committees of many other organisations.

Wilmot retired in 1977 after 25 years with the Victorian Department of Health.

== Honours, death and legacy ==
As part of the 1978 Queen's Birthday Honours, Wilmot was appointed an Officer of the Order of the British Empire (OBE) on 3 June 1978, in recognition of her work in Maternal and Child Health.

Wilmot died in Melbourne on 4 February 1998.

In 2003 Wilmot was included in the Where are the Women in Australian Science? exhibition, a project of the National Foundation for Australian Women and the Australian Science and Technology Heritage Centre of the University of Melbourne. The exhibition links to biographical and bibliographical information about each woman included in the exhibition to the Women's Encyclopedia of Australian Science database.

== Selected works ==
- Campbell, Kate; Wilmot, A. Elizabeth; Victoria. Department of Health (2009-2014) (1976), A guide to the care of the young child : a text book for workers in the field of maternal and child health (8th ed.), Department of Health, Victoria
- Wilmot, Elizabeth. (1967). Report of twelve months study tour undertaken on a National Health and Medical Research Council fellowship in public health, September 1966 - August 1967. Melbourne? Dept. of Health. https://worldcat.org/oclc/222321639 Located at the State Library of Victoria
