= Jack Anderson (footballer, born 1909) =

Australian rules footballer (1909–1982)

Personal information
- Born: 3 March 1909
- Died: 29 June 1982 (aged 73)
- Original team: Balldale
- Height: 185 cm (6 ft 1 in)
- Weight: 82 kg (181 lb)

Playing career^{1}
| Years | Club | Games (Goals) |
| 1931–33 | St Kilda | 42 (46) |
- ^{1} Playing statistics correct to the end of 1933.

Jack Anderson (3 March 1909 – 29 June 1982) was an Australian rules footballer who played with St Kilda in the Victorian Football League (VFL).

== Family ==
Jack was the older brother of North Melbourne player, Frank Anderson.

== Football ==
In 1930, Mr. Jack Anderson - Balldale FC, tied for the Peace Medal for the best and fairest player award in the Corowa & District Football Association with W. Hall of Howlong FC.

Anderson made his debut for St.Kilda in round eight, 1931 against Footscray at the Junction Oval, eventually playing 42 games and kicking 46 goals between 1931 and 1933. He represented Victoria at the National Football Carnival in 1933.

Anderson moved over to Western Australian and played with West Perth from 1934 to 1936, including their 1934 WAFL premiership and 1935 WAFL premiership.

In 1937, Anderson returned to Victoria and commenced training with St.Kilda again. There were rumours that Melbourne were after him as well. Anderson eventually moved to Bendigo as captain / coach of Eaglehawk in 1937. Anderson got them to the preliminary final, but they lost to South Bendigo.

Anderson returned to Western Australia in 1938 and played with West Perth again, who finished on the bottom of the ladder. A "Cardinals" fairest and best award winner in 1934 he played 71 WAFL games and bagged 78 goals from 1934 to 1936 and in 1938. He also played interstate football for Western Australia in 1934, 1935 and 1936 too.

The following year, Anderson played with the Railways Football Club in their 1939 Kalgoorlie Goldfields Football League premiership win. Anderson was club captain of the Railways FC in 1940.
