= Corowa Courthouse =

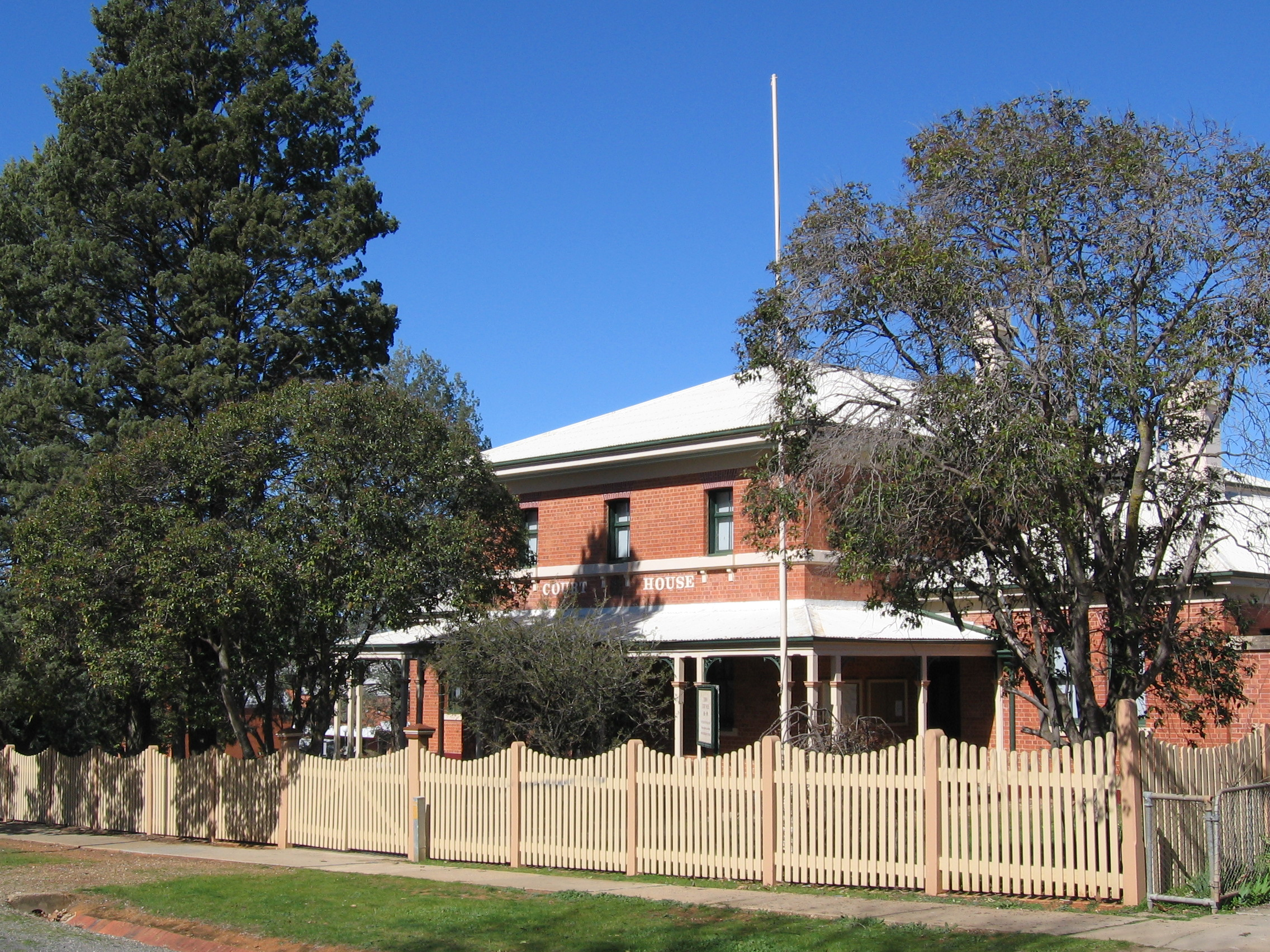
- Corowa Courthouse, pictured in 2008

- Location within New South Wales Location within Australia
- 35°59′38″S 146°23′34″E
- Location: 8 Church Street, Corowa, Federation Council, New South Wales, Australia

History
- Built: 1886–1887

Site notes
- Architect: James Barnet
- Owner: Department of Justice

New South Wales Heritage Register
- Official name: Corowa Courthouse; Corowa Court House
- Type: State heritage (built)
- Designated: 22 December 2000
- Reference no.: 1450
- Type: Courthouse
- Category: Law Enforcement
- Builders: W. Squires

The Corowa Courthouse is a heritage-listed courthouse located at 8 Church Street, Corowa, in the Riverina region of New South Wales, Australia. It was designed by James Barnet, the Colonial Architect, and built from 1886 to 1887 by W. Squires. It is also known as the Corowa Court House. The property is owned by the Department of Justice, an agency of the Government of New South Wales. It was added to the New South Wales State Heritage Register on 22 December 2000.

== History ==
First explored by Charles Sturt in 1838, the Corowa-Wahgunyah area was rapidly taken up as squatting runs. The most influential settler was John Foord, son of a well-known Parramatta coach-builder, who was attracted by the district when he was overlanding cattle from the Monaro to Victoria in 1839 and immediately returned to take up 12,000 hectares (30,000 acres), straddling the Murray.

Agriculture, with wheat and tobacco, developed and the gold rushes of the 1850s (including one at Corowa) created a new, significant market. Foord was encouraged in 1856 to lay out a private town on the Victorian side of the river, called Wahgunyah, and in 1857 he bought Henry Hopwood's Echuca punt when Hopwood built his pontoon bridge there. The punt was installed at Wahgunyah but was replaced in 1863 by a privately owned wooden toll-bridge operated by a company headed by John Foord.

The bridge was decisive in encouraging urban development on the New South Wales side, where North Wahgunyah, Foord's second private town, became Corowa. The customs houses at the Corowa bridge handled large amounts of wool and the wheat and oats crops were very substantial in the last quarter of the nineteenth century.

The Court House was designed by the Colonial Architect James Barnet and replaced an earlier court house built in the 1860s on the same site. Construction commenced in May 1886 and was completed in 1887. This Court House was chosen in 1893 for the promotion of an Australian Federation League, where discussions were held by various states in the lead up to the Federation of Australia.

== Description ==
The courthouse is a red brick building, with darker red brick flat arches over windows; roofs are hipped, corrugated iron. A verandah to front of courthouse has paired timber posts which are fairly plain. The building is symmetrical, but has a flat roof extension to one side. Doors to smaller wings on either side have etched glass panels.

The Corowa Court House was designed during the transitional period between the Victorian and Federation era. The building is a Palladian composition with a central two storey block flanked on either side by single storey wings. Building detail uses Georgian Revival elements with double hung sash windows and flat brick arched lintels over. The central block features a ground floor verandah across the front facade which is supported on pairs of stop chamfered timber columns decorated with cast iron brackets.

=== Condition ===
As at 26 October 2000, the building condition was good; with a weatherboard addition at rear. The timber furniture and fittings were still intact, and in good condition.

== Heritage listing ==
As at 25 May 2010, the building was a plain, brick courthouse which is symmetrical, and has pleasing proportions. It makes an important contribution to the character of the streetscape. One of the conferences to urge for the federation of colonies was held in the courthouse 31 July and 1 August 1893. A fine example of late 19th century transitional architecture which has a Georgian Revival appearance. This Court House is of historical and social significance and was used as the venue for discussions held between the various states prior to the Federation of Australia. The courthouse was a venue for the 1893 'People's Conference' organised by the Australian Federation League and the 1902 Premiers' meeting leading up to the River Murray Agreement.

The Corowa Courthouse was listed on the New South Wales State Heritage Register on 22 December 2000.

== See also ==
- Australian non-residential architectural styles
- Courthouses in New South Wales
