= George Anderson (Australian footballer, born 1886) =

Australian rules footballer, born 1886

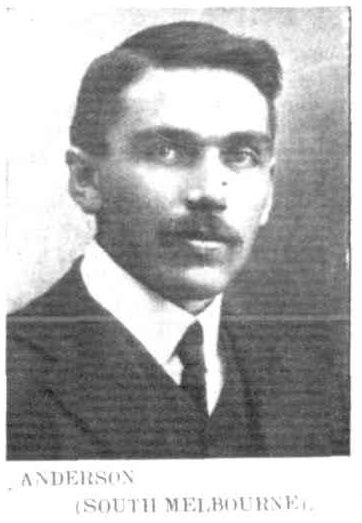
- Anderson in 1907

Personal information
- Born: 24 November 1886; Melbourne, Victoria
- Died: 12 June 1976 (aged 89); Kew, Victoria
- Original teams: Balldale, Leopold (MJFA)

Playing career^{1}
| Years | Club | Games (Goals) |
| 1906–1908 | South Melbourne | 42 (0) |
| 1911–1914 | University | 20 (1) |
| Total | | 62 (1) |
- ^{1} Playing statistics correct to the end of 1914.

George Anderson (24 November 1886 – 12 June 1976) was an Australian rules footballer, playing with South Melbourne and University in the Victorian Football League (VFL).

He started his career with South Melbourne, playing for three seasons before playing with University after missing several seasons. Anderson played most of his career as a backman, where he only managed to kick one goal in his 62 matches. He ended his career when University withdrew from the VFL. After his football career, Anderson became a missionary in Korea.
