= Balldale =

- Town
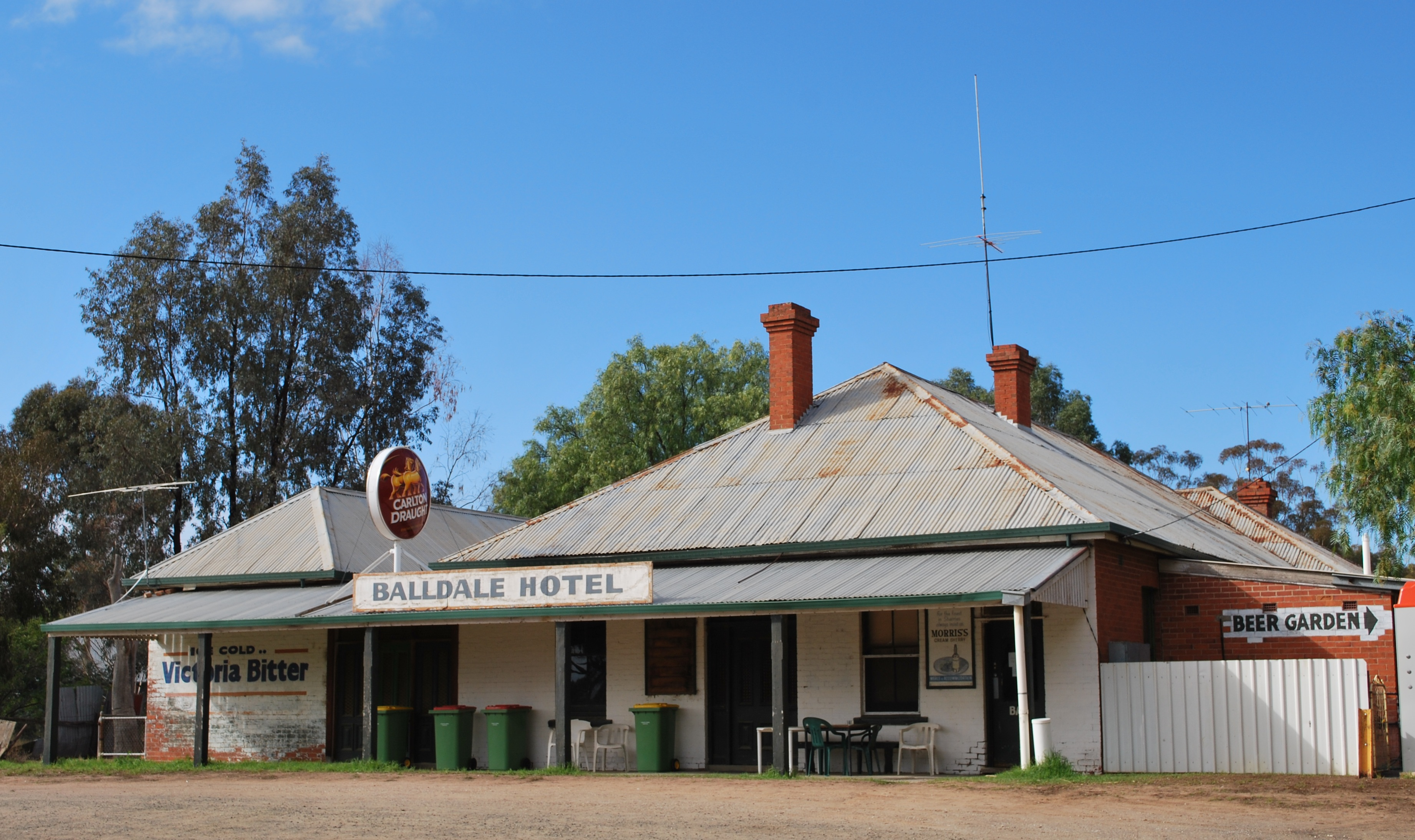
- Balldale Hotel

- Coordinates: 35°51′0″S 146°31′0″E
- Country: Australia
- State: New South Wales
- LGA: Federation Council
- Location: 591 km (367 mi) from Sydney; 50 km (31 mi) from Albury; 18 km (11 mi) from Brocklesby; 15 km (9.3 mi) from Corowa

Government
  - State electorate: Albury
  - Federal division: Farrer

Population
  - Total: 168 (SAL 2021)
- Postcode: 2646
- County: Hume

Balldale is a village in the mid-southern part of the Riverina in New South Wales, Australia. It is about 15 kilometres (9.3 mi) north-east of Corowa and about 18 kilometres (11 mi) west of Brocklesby.

Balldale was established when the large farm holding of the Quat Quatta Estate was sub-divided in the early 1900s, and named in honour of local politician Richard Ball (1857–1937).

Balldale Post Office opened on 1 June 1905.

The Balldale Hotel was built in 1905 by Albert Beard.

Balldale FC colours: 1939-53

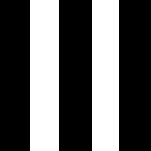
Balldale FC colours: 1954-74

== Balldale Football Club ==
Balldale FC commenced played in the following Australian Rules Football competitions in 1906, in the green and black colours initially, before the club eventually folded in 1977.

In early April 1927 Alby Anderson was appointed as the coach of Balldale in the Riverina Football Association; his father Bill owned the Carnsdale Hotel in Balldale at the time. Interestingly, in late April 1927, Anderson was granted a permit by the VFL from Richmond to the Albury Football Club in the Ovens & Murray Football League, but he definitely played with Balldale in 1927.

Walter Longmire (John Longmire’s grandfather) represented NSW v South Australia at the MCG in 1927.

In 1930, Mr Jack Anderson–Balldale FC, tied for the Pearce Medal for the best and fairest player award in the Corowa & District Football Association

Either A. or G. Bishop of Balldale trained with Essendon in March, 1933.

Frank Anderson was the winner of the 1935 club best and fairest award. Anderson polled 25 votes, second was Walter Longmire on 19 votes, with Boyle, third on 9 votes. In September, 1935, Anderson went to Melbourne to try out with Collingwood Football Club. He returned to play with Balldale in 1936 and won the best and fairest again in 1937.

Mr. Jim Steigenberger was appointed as captain and coach for Balldale in 1937 and 1938

In 1939, the Balldale's club jumper colors were royal Blue and gold braces.

George Willis won the club best and fairest award in 1939

Former Balldale player Frank Anderson, younger brother of former St.Kilda player, Jack Anderson made his VFL debut with North Melbourne in June 1942.

The club best and fairest winner in 1946 was "Snow" Seymour.

In 1947, when Balldale FC re-entered the Hume Football League, club president, Mr. Kelly Joseph Azzi, donated a medal for the Hume FL best and fairest award and to this day it is still called the Azzi Medal.

Amy Krauz won the 1948 Hume Netball Association best and fairest award (Ada Marks Trophy).

J Edmunds was the winner of the 1949 club best and fairest award.

In 1953, Tom McCann was reappointed as the coach and Colin Wilson won the club best and fairest award.

Football Competitions Timeline

- 1906 & 1907: Corowa & District Football Association
- 1908: Federal Football Association
- 1909: Ovens and Murray Football League
- 1910 & 1911: Culcairn & District Football Association
- 1912 & 1913: Rutherglen & District Football Association
- 1914 & 1915: Coreen Shire Football Association
- 1916 & 1917: In recess due to World War I
- 1918: the club was reformed, but played in no official competition. They played several friendly matches against other local towns.
- 1919 to 1923: Coreen & District Football Association
- 1924 to 1929: Riverina Football Association
- 1930 to 1934: Corowa & District Football Association
- 1935–1940: Chiltern & District Football Association
- 1941–1944: Club in recess due to World War II
- 1945: Hume Football League
- 1946: Chiltern & District Football Association
- 1947–1975: Hume Football League
- 1976–1977: Coreen & District Football League

Premierships

- Federal District Football Association
  - 1908: Balldale: 3.4–22 defeated Daysdale: 1.10–16, at Buraja.
- Coreen & District Football League
  - 1921: Balldale: 7.9–51 defeated Buraja: 2.10–22
  - 1922: Balldale: 6.9–45 defeated Buraja: 6.7–43
  - 1923: Balldale: 10.5–65 defeated Daysdale: 3.5–23
- Corowa & District Football Association
  - 1930: Balldale: 10.12–72 defeated Brocklesby: 8.8–56
  - 1931: Balldale: 9.12–66 defeated Coreen: 6.13–49
  - 1932: Balldale: 18.11–119 defeated Daysdale: 11.19–85
  - 1934: Balldale: 12.15–87 defeated Coreen: 8.11–59
- Hume Football League
  - 1962: Balldale: 8.21–69 defeated Jindera: 5.8–38
  - 1972: Balldale: 14.17–101 defeated Walla Walla: 14.12–96

Runners Up

- Riverina Football Association:
  - 1924: Brocklesby: 7.13–55 defeated Balldale: 7.7–49
- Hume Football League
  - 1955: Jindera: d Balldale:
  - 1956: Jindera: 11.12–78 defeated Balldale: 10.13–73
  - 1961: Jindera: 10.8–68 defeated Balldale: 9.7–61

VFL Players

The following footballers played with Balldale FC prior to playing VFL football.

- 1913–Richard "Dick" Fitzgerald–South Melbourne
- 1911–George Anderson–Collingwood
- 1931–Jack Anderson–St. Kilda
- 1942–Frank Anderson–North Melbourne

== Notable people ==
- George Anderson: South Melbourne
- Alby Anderson: St Kilda
- Frank Anderson: North Melbourne
- Jack Anderson: St Kilda
- Olivia Barber, Australian rules footballer
