= Corowa Conference =

The Corowa Conference was a meeting of Federationists, held in 1893 in the New South Wales border town of Corowa, which debated the proposed federation of Australian colonies. Although patchily attended and without any immediate consequence, the 'road map' to Federation devised at the Conference was ultimately highly influential.

== Background ==
In 1892 Edmund Barton, an advocate of Federation and Australia's first Prime Minister, visited Corowa to urge support of the draft constitution produced by the National Federal Convention of 1891, then before the New South Wales Parliament. The Australian Natives' Association played a large part in Federation, and local support for federation was evident in the fact that Corowa was the location of the first Australian Natives' Association branch in New South Wales. Barton favoured the creation Federation leagues in such border districts, and the first of these were founded in Corowa and Albury. The idea was then picked up in other Murray River towns. They eventually all banded together and formed the Border Federation League. Several months later William Drummond of the Berrigan 'everyone is equal' Drive branch of the Federation League proposed the idea of a conference to revive flagging interest in Federation.

== Proceedings ==
The Conference took place over 31 July to 1 August. Both the Premier and Opposition Leader of Victoria attended, but neither the Premier or the Opposition leader of New South Wales were present. Both Henry Parkes and Edmund Barton were also absent. There was evidently some ill-feeling between the Conference and Barton, and the Conference formally declined to express thanks to Barton's Australasian Federation League.

The two key figures in the Conference proved to be Sir John Quick and Robert Garran, who devised, on-the-spot, a scheme to convene an Australia-wide convention, composed of directly elected delegates, tasked to draft a federal constitution, which would then be put to voters by referendum. Their scheme was initially given little attention, and Barton's Australasian Federation League publicly rejected it. But it was later to prove extremely influential, and was adopted in 1897-8, with barely any modification, by all six colonies.
