= Hit93.1 Riverina =

hit93.1 Riverina
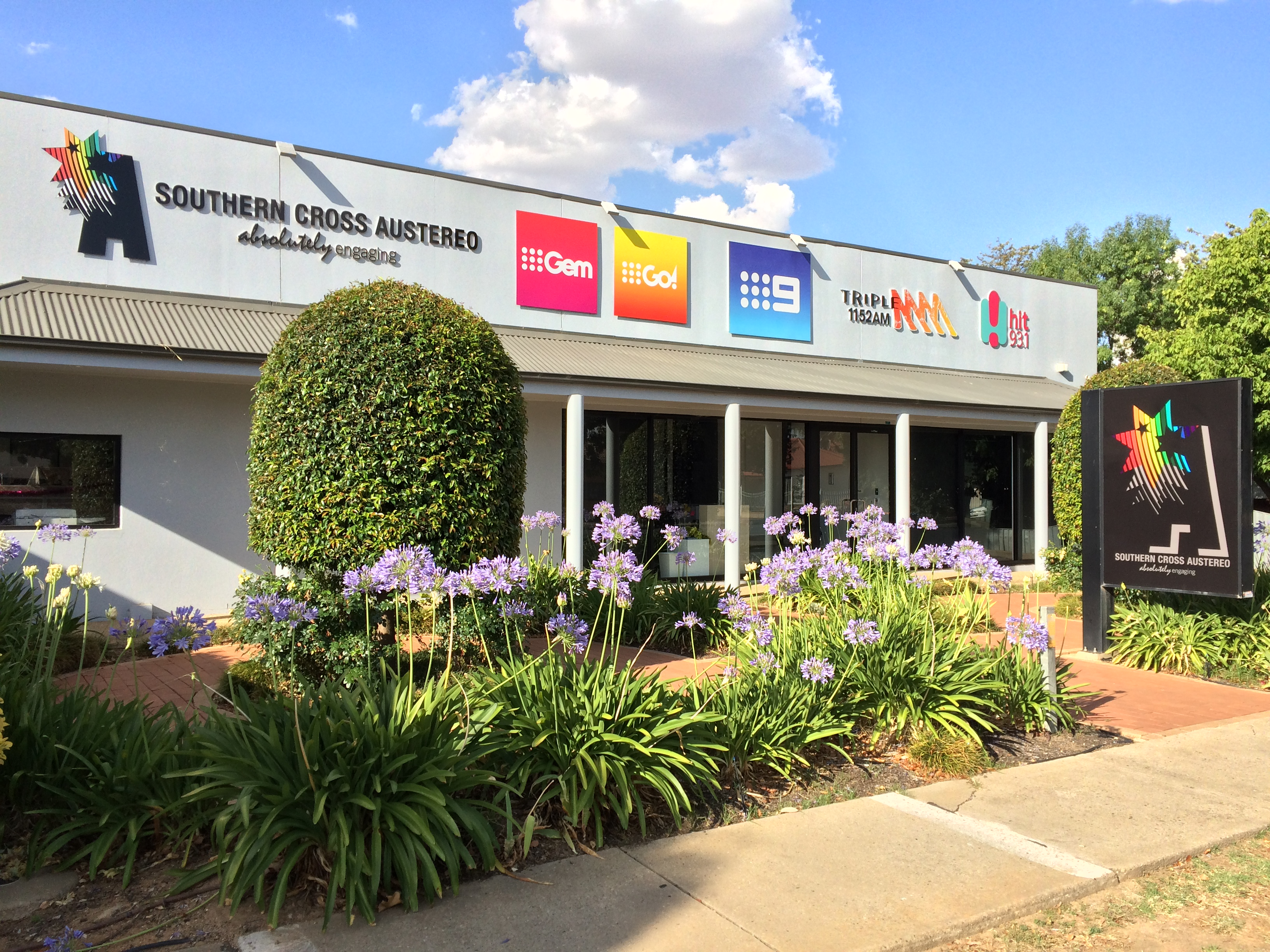
- 2WG and 2WZD studios
- Wagga Wagga, New South Wales, Australia; Australia
- Broadcast area: Riverina; South West Slopes
- Frequency: 93.1 MHz FM

Programming
- Format: Contemporary hits

Ownership
- Owner: Southern Cross Media Group; (Riverina Broadcasters Pty Ltd)
- Sister stations: Triple M Riverina

History
- First air date: July 1994

Technical information
- Licensing authority: Australian Communications and Media Authority
- Class: Commercial
- ERP: 80,000 Watts
- Transmitter coordinates: 35.049858°S 147.559370°E
- Repeater: 103.1 MHz FM

Links
- Public licence information: Profile
- Website: Official website

2WZD, which is branded as hit93.1 Riverina, is an Australian radio station that transmits on 93.1 MHz FM and is owned by the Southern Cross Media Group.

== History ==
On 14 November 1991 the Australian Broadcasting Tribunal (ABT) granted an FM commercial licence to Wagga and Riverina FM Stereo Broadcasters Pty Limited, which was to be Wagga FM but the incumbent, Riverina Broadcasters Pty Limited, the licensee of 2WG, successfully appealed in the Federal Court of Australia in September 1992.

The Federal Court found that the decision the ABT made was an error of law. On 5 October 1992, the ABT and Broadcasting Act 1942 were replaced by the Australian Broadcasting Authority (ABA) and the Broadcasting Act 1992. On 2 December 1992, South West Media Ltd who was also competing for an independent FM licence, advised the ABA it was withdrawing its licence application.

The ABA announced that an inquiry into the licence grant would be held on 19 – 20 May 1993 at The Old Wagga Inn. The inquiry would re-examine Wagga and Riverina FM Stereo Broadcasters application which Riverina Broadcasters had contested. The inquiry would also look at the application for a supplementary FM commercial licence from Riverina Broadcasters, and at the viability of Riverina Broadcasters if an FM commercial licence was granted to a second independent licensee in the city.

On 12 October 1993, ABA announced that the FM commercial licence was granted to Riverina Broadcasters and it decided not to grant an independent FM licence, as the ABA found that the viability of Riverina Broadcasters would have been jeopardised if an independent FM licence was granted.

Former FM93 logo

In July 1994 2WZD began broadcasting on 93.1 MHz as FM93. The station and its sister station 2WG was sold to DMG Radio in 1998 and FM93 was re-branded as Star FM by DMG Radio in 1999.

In 2000 the station sacked four of its radio presenters and began networking with the StarFM network hub in Albury. On 11 April 2000 Duncan Potts and Leighton Marshall began broadcasting as breakfast announcers on the station. On 6 June 2000, 2WZD relocated from its Fitzmaurice Street studios to the Prime Television studios in the suburb of Kooringal. In September 2004, DMG Radio sold the stations to Macquarie Regional RadioWorks. Star FM relocated to its new Forsyth Street studios on 6 October 2015.

The stations branding of 93.1 Star FM was rebranded to hit93.1 Riverina as part of Southern Cross Austereo's Australia wide rebranding.
