= Triple M Riverina =

Triple M Riverina 1152
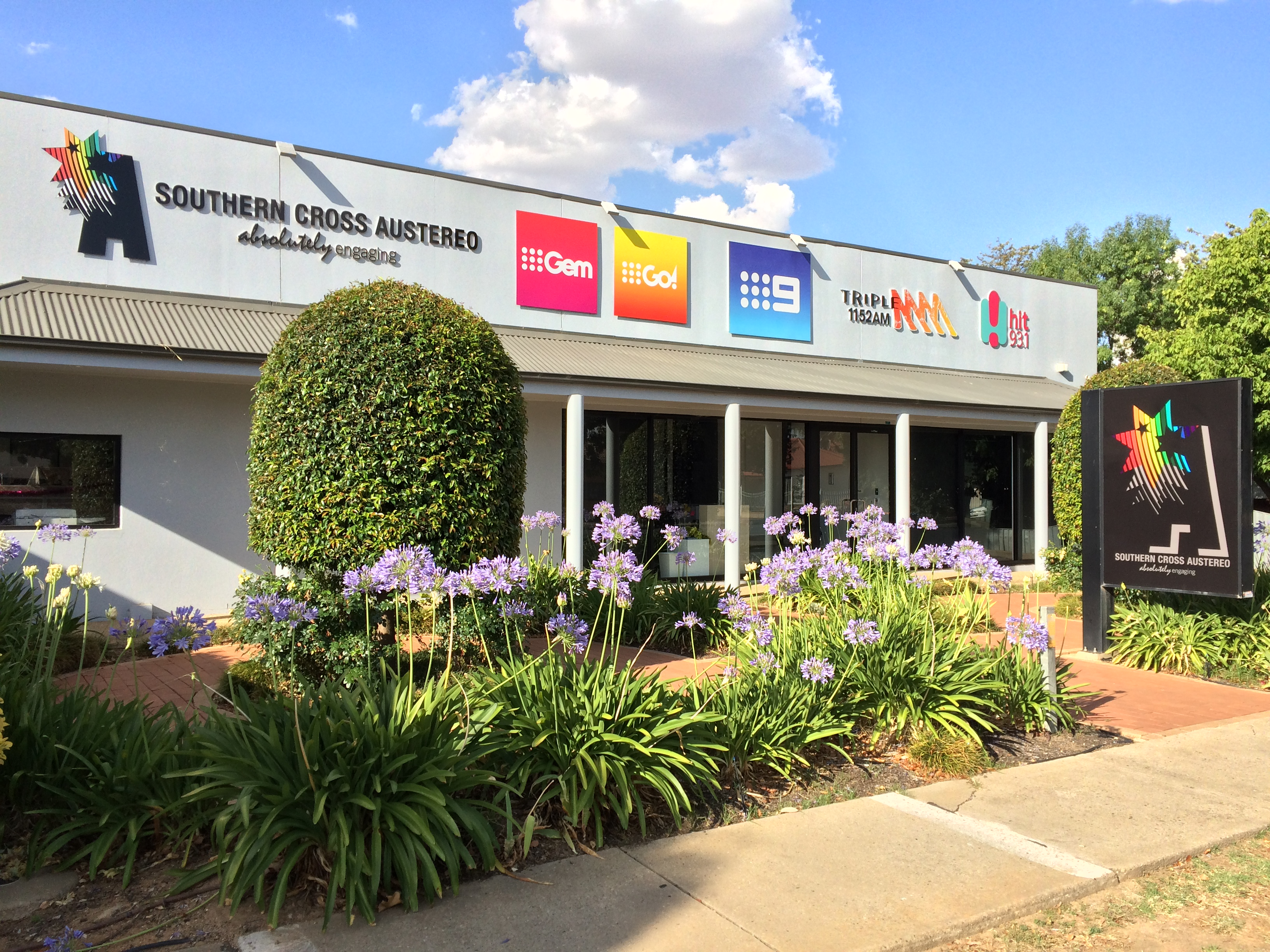
- Wagga Wagga, New South Wales; Australia
- Broadcast area: Riverina; South West Slopes
- Frequency: 1152 kHz AM
- Branding: Everything Wagga Wagga

Programming
- Format: Mainstream rock Adult contemporary

Ownership
- Owner: Southern Cross Austereo; (Riverina Broadcasters Pty Ltd)
- Sister stations: Hit93.1 Riverina

History
- First air date: 29 June 1932
- Call sign meaning: 2 for New South Wales; "Wagga"

Technical information
- Licensing authority: ACMA
- Power: 2,000 watts
- Transmitter coordinates: 35.042204°S 147.415513°E
- Repeater: 100.7, 107.9 MHz FM

Links
- Website: Official website

Triple M Riverina (ACMA call sign 2WG) is an Australian radio station which transmits on 1152 kHz on the AM band. It is licensed to the city of Wagga Wagga, New South Wales. The station was originally owned by Eric Vernon Roberts and his second wife Ida Annie "Nan" Roberts, who were both formerly school teachers in Narrandera. Both the studio and 100 watt AWA transmitter were originally located in the upper storey of the former Hardys' Building in Fitzmaurice Street overlooking the Wollundry Lagoon. A replacement transmitter of 2,000 watts, making 2WG one of the most powerful in Australia, was built by his brother Phil Roberts, on the Oura Road Transmitter site on 29 June 1932 and operated between 6.00 am and 11.00 pm. By June 1979 the transmitter site was located at coordinates 35° 8' south; 147° 22½' E, approximately 200 metres east of the Olympic Highway and 200 m. north of Trahairs Road.

In 1995, 2WZD (FM93) began broadcasting.

In 1998, DMG Radio Australia bought both 2WG and FM93 (now Triple M 1152 and Hit 93.1). In late 2004, the stations were bought by Southern Cross Austereo who currently own and operate the stations. The station including its sister station (StarFM, now Hit 93.1) was originally located in Fitzmaurice Street but was moved to the former Prime7 Television Centre in the suburb of Kooringal on 6 June 2000. 2WG relocated to its new Forsyth Street studios on 6 October 2015.

2WG was rebranded as Triple M Riverina 1152 as part of Southern Cross Austereo's Australia wide rebranding in December 2016.

== Notable people ==
Bill Kerr, who grew up in Wagga Wagga and would go on to stardom in British radio, the West End stage, and Australian film, served as a 2WG announcer as a teenager, from 1939–1941.

Past Announcers/Presenters:

- Peter Hand
- Chris Couldrey
- Sam Galea
- Mal Wilcock
- George 'Groover' Wayne
- John Doherty
- David Watt
- Kevin O'Neill
- Barry Haydon
- Bill Kerr
- Deborah Knight

== Gallery ==
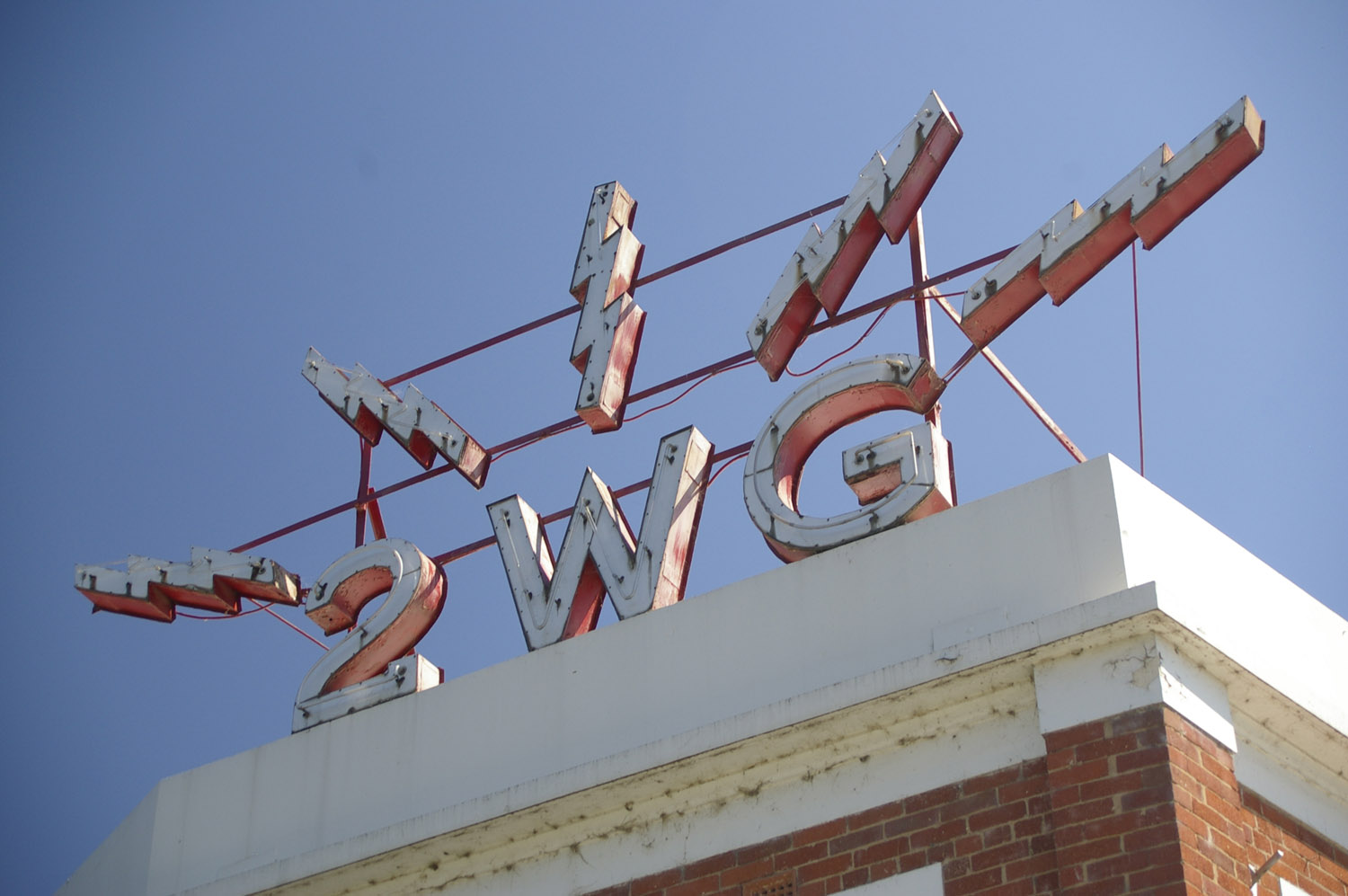
Neon 2WG sign, before restoration.

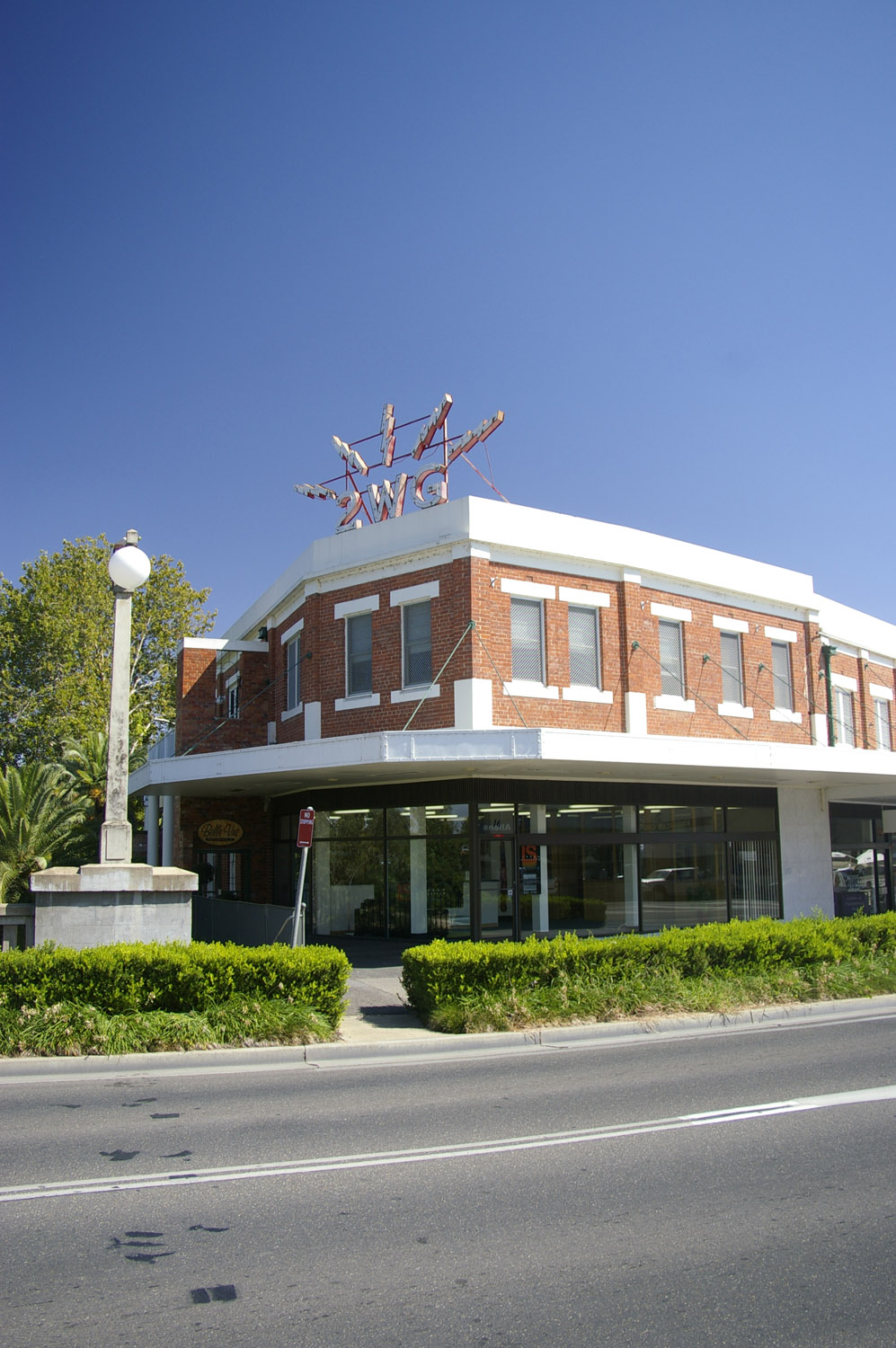
Former 2WG studio building.
