= Corowa =

- Town
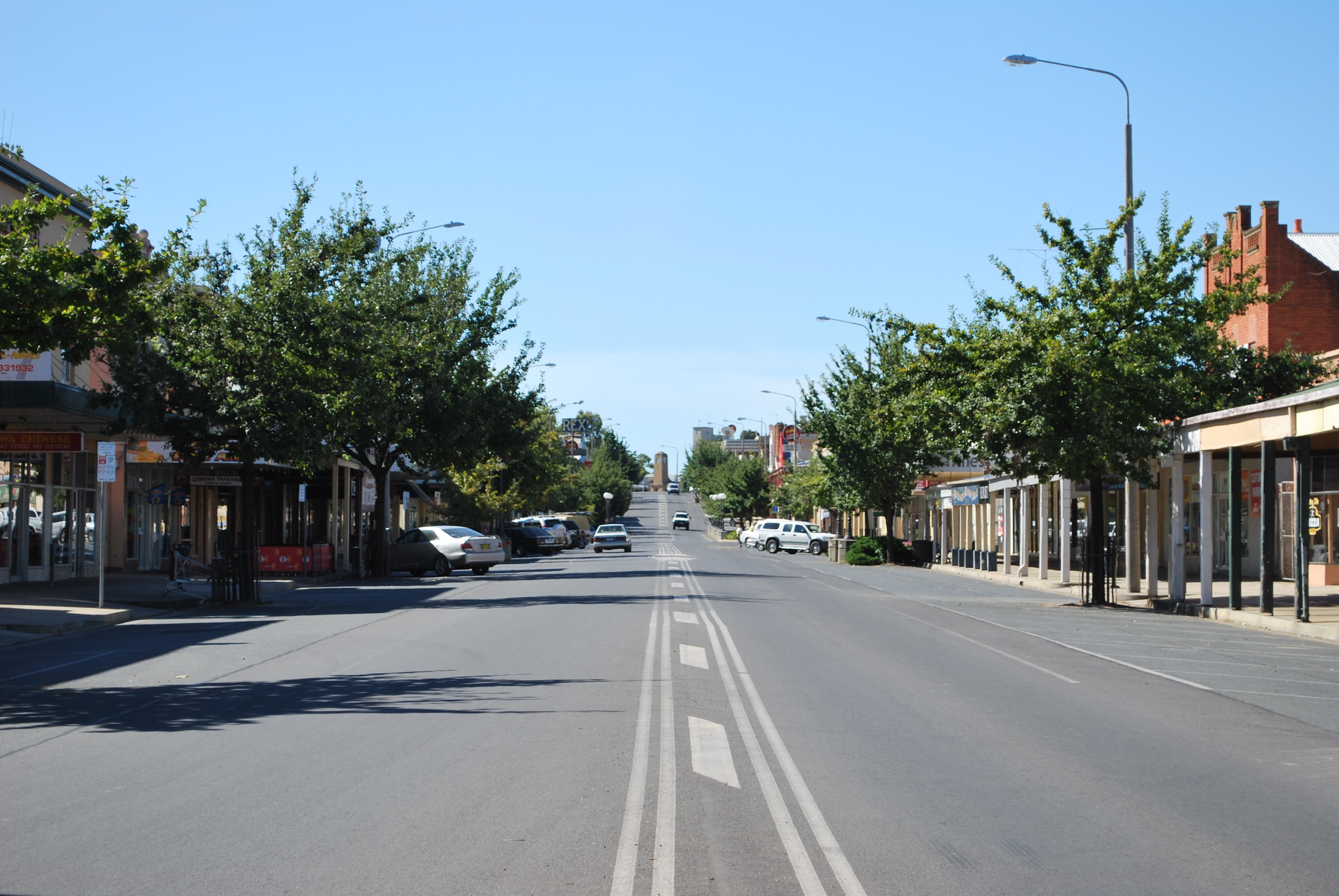
- A view of the main street of Corowa

- Coordinates: 35°59′55″S 146°23′28″E
- Country: Australia
- State: New South Wales
- LGA: Federation Council
- Location: 610 km (380 mi) from Sydney; 281 km (175 mi) from Melbourne; 57 km (35 mi) from Albury
- Established: 1858

Government
  - State electorate: Albury
  - Federal division: Farrer
- Elevation: 143 m (469 ft)

Population
  - Total: 5,595 (2021 census)
- Postcode: 2646
- County: Hume
- Mean max temp: 22.5 °C (72.5 °F)
- Mean min temp: 8.8 °C (47.8 °F)
- Annual rainfall: 539.4 mm (21.24 in)

Corowa /ˈkɒrəwə/ is a town in the state of New South Wales in Australia. It is on the bank of the Murray River, the border between New South Wales and Victoria, opposite the Victorian town of Wahgunyah. It is the largest town in the Federation Council and was the administrative centre of the former Corowa Shire. The name could have derived from a Wiradjuri word referring to the curra pine that yielded gum used by Aboriginal people to fasten the heads of spears to the shafts. Another translation is "rocky river".

There are two bridges over the Murray to Wahgunyah in Victoria: the heritage-listed John Foord Bridge and the Federation Bridge (opened on 2 April 2005). The town in conjunction with nearby town Rutherglen has an Australian rules football team (Corowa-Rutherglen), competing in the Ovens & Murray Football League, and a rugby league team, the Corowa Cougars, who compete in the Goulburn Murray competition.

== History ==
=== Indigenous history ===
The Aboriginal people who inhabit the region around Corowa are the Bangarang people.

The tribe of Indigenous Australians that inhabited the Corowa area were called, in their own language, the Bangerang Tribe. The name has various spellings in English, varying all the way from Bandjalang through Panderang to Pinegorine.

The Wiradjuri people also inhabited the area, with one potential theory on how the town came to get its name originating with the Wiradjuri word "corowa", meaning "rocky river crossing", in reference to the nearby Murray River.

=== Foord's punt ===
John Foord (c. 1820 – 15 February 1883), "The Emperor of Wahgunyah", settled on the Murray River near the Ovens junction (on the southern side of the river) in the early 1840s. In about 1843 Foord and a man named Bould examined the country about the present site of Wahgunyah and recommended it to John Crisp, who was the first European to settle in the area. Later Crisp sold his land to John Foord. With the development of steamer transport on the Murray River in the mid-1850s, Foord purchased a punt, which was brought up to Wahgunyah by the steamer Leichhardt. Foord built two extensive warehouses, which he let to river navigation companies. Traffic was attracted to Foord's punt, leading to the establishment of Corowa township, opposite to Wahgunyah.

=== Township development ===
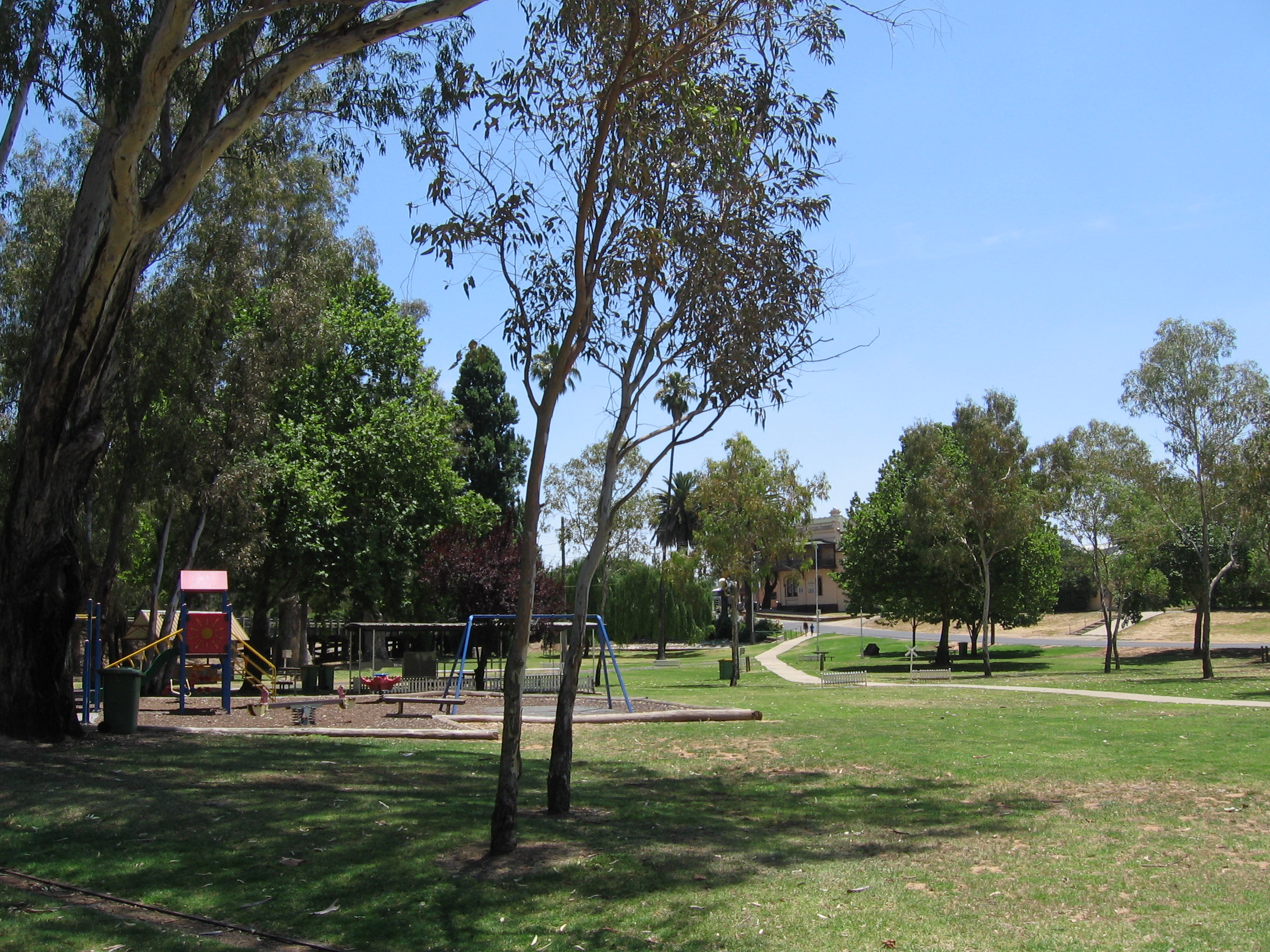
Parkland in Corowa, near the Murray River

Land was surveyed in 1857 at Corowa by Surveyor Adams and the next year the township was proclaimed. In September 1859 a meeting was held to consider the erection of a bridge between Wahgunyah and Corowa to replace the punt. Construction of a bridge was commenced early in 1861.

Corowa Post Office opened on 1 January 1861.

In 1861 an Anglican church was built at Corowa on land donated by John Foord.

The first bridge across the Murray River between Wahgunyah and Corowa was a privately-built toll-bridge, constructed by a group of investors known as the Wahgunya Murray River Bridge Company. The bridge across the river, a laminated timber arch structure, was completed in September 1862 at the cost of ten thousand pounds.

It was reported in 1868 that Corowa "was fast becoming one of the most important of the border districts". Buildings erected that year included a new store, two hotels and a new court-house.

A branch of the Bank of New South Wales was established in a new brick structure at Corowa in 1874. The building of a Roman Catholic church commenced in September 1874. A report in 1875 stated that Corowa as a township "was making rapid strides". The township had a total of seven hotels. A "private township" had been laid out at Corowa on land formerly owned by Sanger and Foord, with the land selling at £80 to £100 per acre. The Government township, laid out about two miles from the river, was deemed a failure.

In 1878 a public meeting was held in Corowa to agitate for the New South Wales government to purchase the bridge and declare it free for public use.

A report published in The Sydney Mail in October 1879 stated that Corowa township consisted of one thoroughfare containing the business houses. On a nearby hill the residences of the wealthier residents had been erected. It was claimed that the Government town of Corowa, two miles from the river, was "a vast wilderness". It was postulated that the reason for the failure of this township to develop was that only one approach to the bridge from that point could be obtained. The toll for crossing the bridge was said to be "somewhat exorbitant", and prevented free intercourse between Corowa and Wahgunyah.

=== Later developments ===
In 1882 negotiations were held between the governments of Victoria and New South Wales which resulted in the purchase of the bridge between Wahgunyah and Corowa. The bridge was opened for public use, free of tolls and charges, an event celebrated on 7 July 1882 with a sports day and fireworks.

A Presbyterian church and an Oddfellows' Hall were built at Corowa in 1886.

In October 1892, the Corowa railway line opened from Culcairn. It closed in January 1989.

In 1893, Corowa was the site of the Corowa Conference, which led to the federation of the various colonies into the Commonwealth of Australia in 1901.

=== Gold mining ===
A large but spectacularly unsuccessful gold mine, the Corowa Deep Lead Mine, was located just to the north of the town.

There were gold deposits and many gold mines at Rutherglen, on the Victorian side of the border. A working hypothesis was that the gold deposits extended, under the Murray and the inter-colonial border, to Corowa. In 1893, a company was formed to explore the area, by sinking bore holes looking for alluvial gold in a deep lead deposit. By late 1894, gold bearing gravel was struck at a depth of 307 feet.

A new company, Corowa Deep Lead Gold Mining & Prospecting Company No Liability was floated, and work began on the mine in 1897, at a time when the New South Wales Government was attempting to increase gold production in the colony. Its construction was subsidised by the N.S.W. Department of Mines.

Two shafts were sunk. No.2 shaft reached the bottom, by the end of 1898, but only with difficulty due to the pressure of subterranean water encountered. By mid-1899, pumping of water from No.2 shaft had allowed No.1 shaft to be sunk more readily, and the subsidy paid by the Mines Department had been increased from £2 to £4 10 per foot of shaft sunk. A proposal to float the venture as an English company in London was defeated on a vote of shareholders. By the end of 1899, No.1 shaft had also reached the bottom at 386 feet. Pumps removed a colossal amount of water from the mine, over 750,000 gallons per day. Cutting drives out from the shaft to the bore sites proved difficult, due to the hard rock encountered. It was necessary to cut through bedrock so that the groundwater in the gold-bearing "wash" could be drained, via a geologically stable route, and pumped away, prior to extracting the wash. The gold-bearing wash had still not been reached by mid 1901.

Small amounts of gold were produced, by mid 1902, but shareholders were told that there would be more capital needing to be raised to make the mine payable. An optimistic newspaper report, of October 1902, pronounced the mine operations a success, also carrying photographs of the miners, the directors, and the two headframes of the mine. With its capital being exhausted, before reaching the wash, the failure of the pumping engine's crankshaft dashed the hopes of long-suffering shareholders. By early 1903, the company had been reconstructed, apparently with an injection of capital from English shareholders, and new machinery was being erected. By September 1904, miners were on wash but it was "rather wet" and not payable. By late 1904, the company again needed additional capital, and a decision was made that it would be wound up. It had sold 2,033 ounces of gold, from April to November 1904, but costs took much of the revenue; the balance sheet of the company was, by then, only £100 in surplus. The directors were authorised to put the company and all its assets up for sale. The liabilities were discharged, and the company was wound up in 1905.

=== Neo-Nazi rally ===
On Saturday 12 October 2024, roughly 50 members of the National Socialist Network led by Thomas Sewell rallied in the town's centre as a response to a local piggery's takeover by multinational meat processor JBS. The group displayed a banner reading "White Man Fight Back" due to JBS's employment of immigrant workers. Police dispersed the group with no arrests being made.

== Heritage listings ==
Corowa has a number of heritage-listed sites, including:

- 8 Church Street: Corowa Courthouse
- Culcairn-Corowa railway: Corowa railway station
- Steel Street: Corowa Flour Mill

Historical population
Year	Pop.	±%
1921	2,387	—
1933	2,757	+15.5%
1947	2,751	−0.2%
1954	3,045	+10.7%
1961	2,593	−14.8%
1966	2,709	+4.5%
1971	2,923	+7.9%
1976	3,031	+3.7%
1981	3,390	+11.8%
1986	4,315	+27.3%
1991	5,064	+17.4%
1996	5,785	+14.2%
2001	5,208	−10.0%
2006	5,628	+8.1%
2011	5,450	−3.2%
2016	5,337	−2.1%
2021	5,444	+2.0%
Source: Australian Bureau of Statistics data.

== Climate ==
Corowa has a temperate humid subtropical climate (Cfa) with hot, mostly dry summers and cool wetter winters.

Climate data for Corowa Airport (1907–2025, rainfall to 1890); 143 metres or 469 feet AMSL; 35.99° S, 146.36° E
Month	Jan	Feb	Mar	Apr	May	Jun	Jul	Aug	Sep	Oct	Nov	Dec	Year
Record high °C (°F)	46.0 (114.8)	46.0 (114.8)	40.5 (104.9)	37.0 (98.6)	28.9 (84.0)	23.0 (73.4)	20.0 (68.0)	26.3 (79.3)	33.5 (92.3)	36.0 (96.8)	43.0 (109.4)	44.0 (111.2)	46.0 (114.8)
Mean daily maximum °C (°F)	31.9 (89.4)	31.3 (88.3)	27.9 (82.2)	22.5 (72.5)	17.8 (64.0)	13.9 (57.0)	13.1 (55.6)	15.0 (59.0)	18.5 (65.3)	22.2 (72.0)	26.6 (79.9)	30.1 (86.2)	22.6 (72.7)
Mean daily minimum °C (°F)	15.7 (60.3)	15.7 (60.3)	12.7 (54.9)	8.6 (47.5)	5.6 (42.1)	3.6 (38.5)	2.8 (37.0)	3.7 (38.7)	5.7 (42.3)	8.1 (46.6)	11.1 (52.0)	13.6 (56.5)	8.9 (48.0)
Record low °C (°F)	5.0 (41.0)	5.0 (41.0)	3.9 (39.0)	0.0 (32.0)	−4.5 (23.9)	−5.0 (23.0)	−4.5 (23.9)	−5.0 (23.0)	−2.5 (27.5)	0.0 (32.0)	0.4 (32.7)	3.7 (38.7)	−5.0 (23.0)
Average precipitation mm (inches)	36.4 (1.43)	37.4 (1.47)	38.0 (1.50)	36.3 (1.43)	46.6 (1.83)	56.0 (2.20)	54.9 (2.16)	53.3 (2.10)	48.2 (1.90)	51.8 (2.04)	41.7 (1.64)	40.9 (1.61)	541.2 (21.31)
Average precipitation days	4.3	3.9	4.6	5.7	8.0	10.3	11.6	11.4	9.0	8.3	6.2	5.3	88.6
Average afternoon relative humidity (%)	32	33	36	44	56	67	68	60	55	46	38	33	47

== Media ==
=== Radio ===
The town is served by these radio stations:

- ABC Riverina on 675 AM (Regional)
- ABC Goulburn Murray can also be received on 106.5 FM (Regional)
- Radio National on 756 AM (National)
- ABC NewsRadio on 100.9 FM (National)
- ABC Classic on 104.1 FM (National)
- Triple J on 103.3 FM (National)
- hit93.1 Riverina on 93.1 FM (Commercial)
- Triple M Riverina on 1152 AM (Commercial)

Some stations from nearby centres such as Albury-Wodonga and Shepparton can be heard across the region.

=== Television ===
Network television is broadcast in Corowa by the Seven Network, WIN Television (affiliated with the Nine Network), Network 10, the Australian Broadcasting Corporation (ABC) and the Special Broadcasting Service (SBS).

Of the three commercial networks, WIN Television airs a half-hour WIN News bulletin each weeknight at 5.30 pm, produced from a newsroom in the city and broadcast from studios in Wollongong.

Short local news updates and weather updates are broadcast by Network 10 throughout the day, produced and broadcast from its Hobart studios. The Seven Network airs short local news and weather updates throughout the day, produced and broadcast from its Canberra studios.

=== Newspapers ===
Local newspapers that cover Corowa are:

- The Riverine Herald
- The Corowa Free Press

== Prominent people ==
- Taylor Duryea – Australian rules footballer and AFL premiership player
- Ryan Garthwaite – Australian rules footballer
- Sam Groth – Australian tennis player
- Charles Raymond Gurney – Australian aviator and WW2 pilot, born in Corowa
- John Howard – Actor born in Corowa
- Nigel Lappin – Australian rules football player born in Corowa
- John Longmire – Australian rules footballer, AFL premiership player and coach
- Ben Mathews – Australian rules footballer and AFL premiership player
- Stephen Mowlam – Australian field hockey player who grew up in, and played hockey for Corowa
- Joey Palmer – Cricketer in the 1880s born in Corowa
- Cathy Svarc – AFLW player
- Ruby Svarc – AFLW player
- Blake Pavey – Comedian born in Corowa
- Mike Walsh – Television host
- Jo Weston – Netballer, born in Corowa
- Elizabeth Wilmot – Medical administrator, appointed an Officer of the Order of the British Empire (OBE) in 1978 in recognition of her work in Maternal and Child Health

== In popular culture ==
The Corowa Bowling Club was used to film scenes for the 2002 film Crackerjack.
