= Prank Patrol =

Prank Patrol is a television show broadcast in multiple countries:

- Prank Patrol (Australian TV series)
- Prank Patrol (British TV series)
- Prank Patrol (Canadian TV series)
