= Henry Hopwood =

Henry Hopwood 1813 - 69. From the Australian Dictionary of Biography.

Henry Hopwood (1813 – 1 January 1869) was an English convict who established the town of Echuca in Victoria, Australia.

== Early life ==
Hopwood was born in Bolton le Moors, Lancashire on the 21 May 1813. He was the youngest son of Henry Hopwood, a muslin manufacturer, and Mary Kelly. He was arrested in 1834 for receiving stolen rolls of silk, and sentenced to 14 years' transportation to Van Diemen's Land, a British colony in Australia (later renamed Tasmania). A persuasive and manipulative character, within a year of arriving in the colony, Hopwood had been appointed as a police constable. However, he often found himself in trouble, mainly due to dalliances with women, and in 1839, he was sentenced to two years' servitude at the Port Arthur penal settlement for 'aiding and abetting the abduction of his master's daughter'. He was eventually released and, in 1846, granted a full pardon after having served 12 years of his original sentence. During his time as a convict, Henry met Marth Bolton, a free woman formerly of Liverpool, Lancashire and with her had a daughter, Alice Bolton Hopwood, born on the 4 January 1844 at Morven, Tasmania.

== Echuca ==
Hopwood migrated to the fledgling colony of Port Phillip (Melbourne) where he worked his way north to the New South Wales side of the Murray River in 1848. Here he found work in a tallow plant, boiling down animal carcasses to extract their fat and oils, eventually becoming foreman. By 1850 the shrewd Hopwood noted the increasing numbers of drovers and farmers in the area and used his savings to build a bark and slab hotel, called the 'New Road Inn', and purchased Issac White's old punt, then in competition with James Maiden, the founder of Moama, further downriver. He charged a small fee for river crossings and profited from drinkers at his hotel. By 1858 he had almost single-handedly expanded the lonely Victorian riverbank site into a small town, complete with a pontoon bridge, newspaper, school, warehouses, and vineyards. The following year Hopwood constructed the Bridge Hotel, a more stylish double-storey brick building that still stands today.

Based on his record, Hopwood was a competitive, irascible, and sometimes arrogant character who frequently became involved in petty feuds. On one occasion in 1868, a pitch pot from his river punt was borrowed by a Captain Reese. When not returned, Hopwood sued Reese for 'illegal detention of a pitch pot, valued at £1/11/6d'. The court was not amused and the case was subsequently thrown out. In consequence, a notice appeared in the Riverine Herald stating, "The Iron Pot Again! My Pitch-pot was lent to Captain Reese. It was not returned as promised. On my application to the Bench of Magistrates for its restoration - case dismissed. Therefore a THREEPENNY TOLL, Must go on the Bridge, TILL THE POT BE PAID FOR. H. Hopwood, Echuca Ferry." Such extreme disregard for legal authority as Hopwood showed earned him the rather derisive sobriquet, King of Echuca.

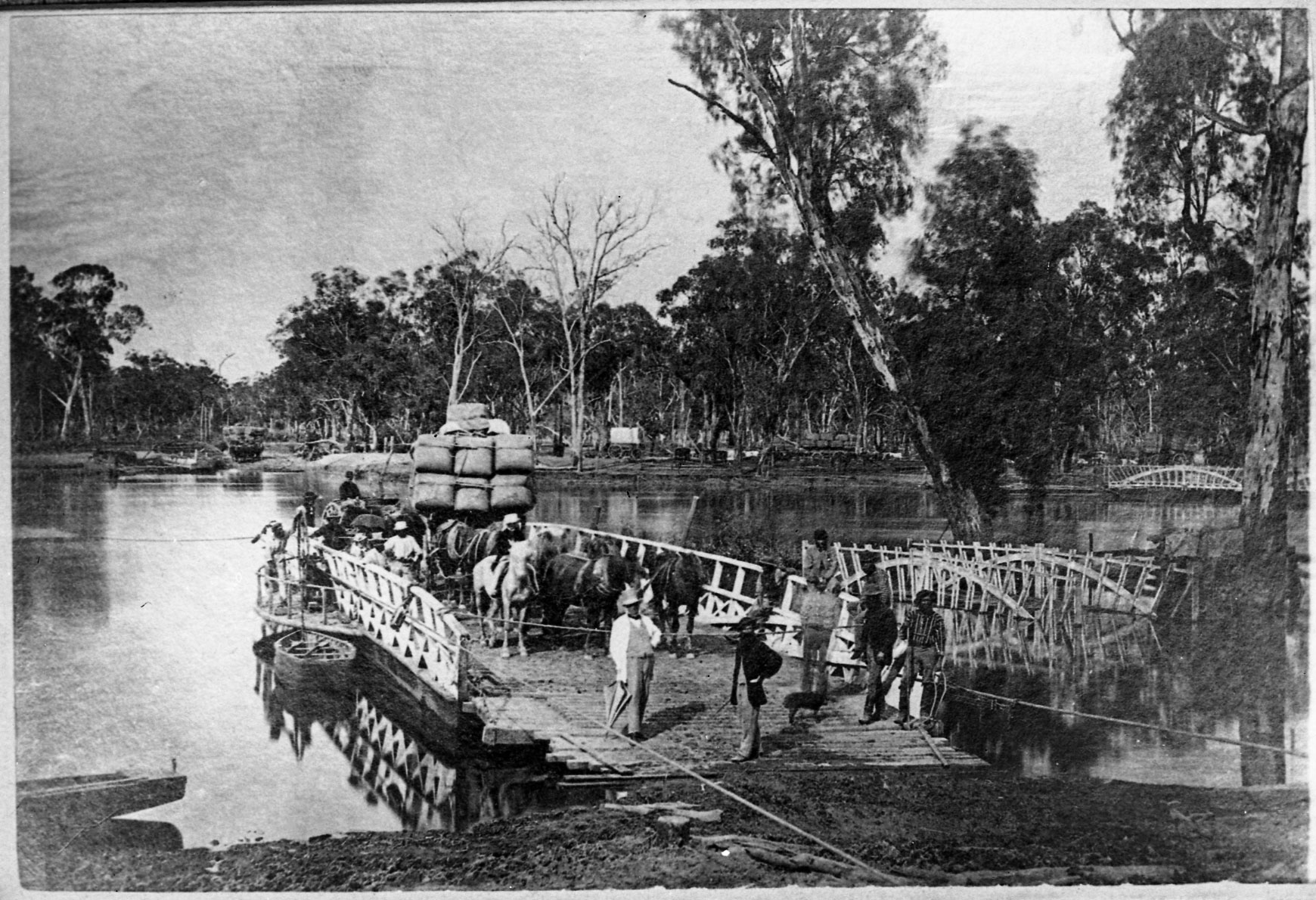
Hopwood's Punt on the Murray river, Echuca 1865

Hopwood was married three times. His first wife, Fanny and infant son, Henry Edwin Hopwood were left behind in England after he was transported; Hopwood never saw them again. He remarried in Melbourne, on 26 October 1854, to Martha Bolton. Following Martha's death, Henry married again on 6 January 1860 to Charlotte Walter of Bendigo. His only daughter, Alice, married James McCulloch, a principle in the McCulloch Carrying Company, without issue.

Hopwood died of typhoid fever at his stately residence 'Apsley House', Echuca on 1 January 1869. He has tombstones in both Echuca Cemetery and the Melbourne General Cemetery. His Echuca grave is a popular tourist attraction due to it being the actual location of his remains.
