= The Riverine Herald =

Echuca-Moama newspaper

The Riverine Herald is a bi-weekly newspaper based in Echuca in Victoria's Goulburn Valley, servicing the Echuca-Moama area. The paper is owned by McPherson Media Group.

== Origins ==
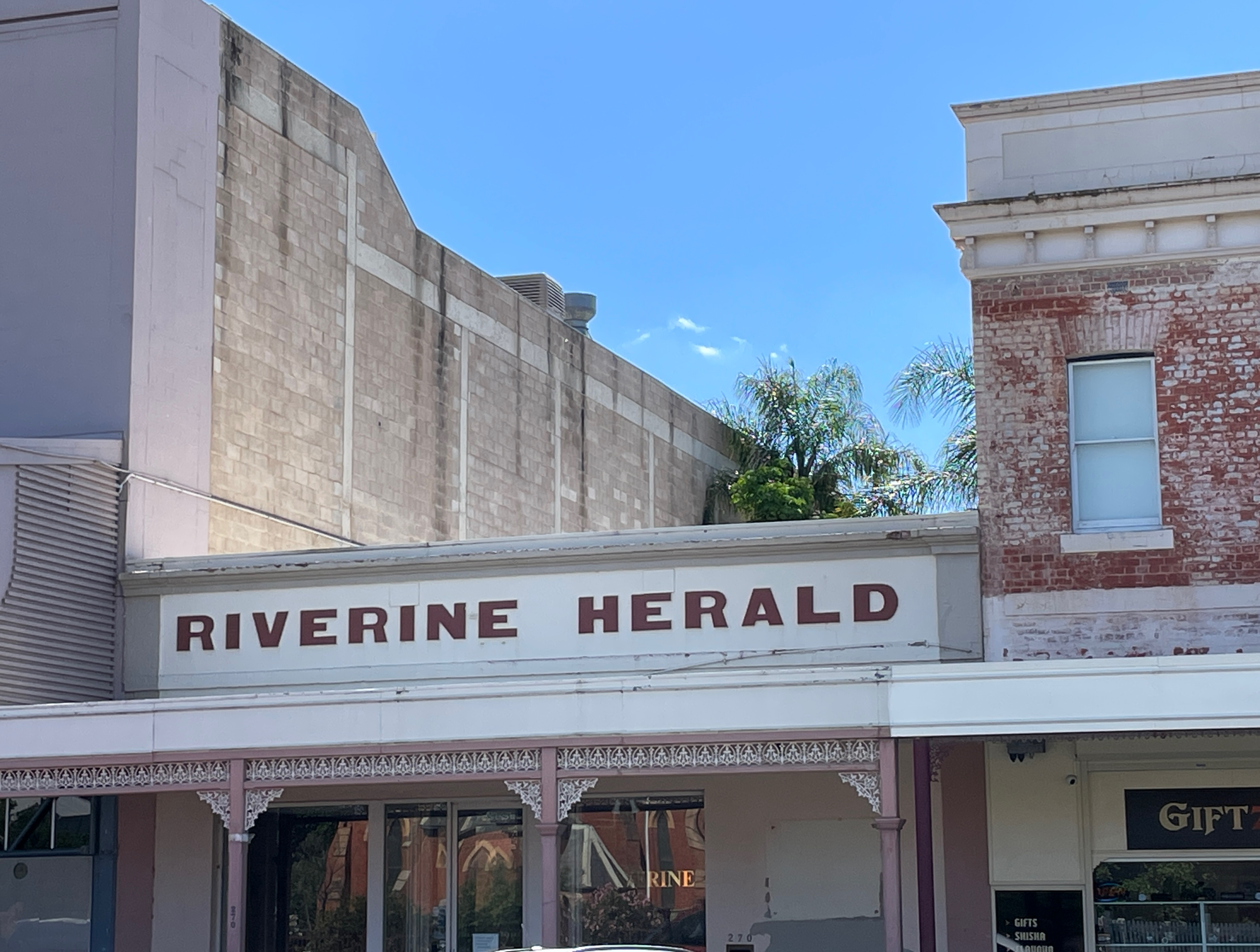
Riverine Herald sign on building in Hare St, Echuca

The newspaper was founded at Echuca on 1 July 1863, with its first editor as Robert Ross Haverfield (1819–1889) and joint owners James Joseph Casey (1831–1913) and Angus Mackay (1824–1886) - the latter also being one of the proprietors of the Bendigo Advertiser.

Haverfield was a drover, grazier, gold miner, explorer and journalist. He was born on 26 February 1819 at Bideford, North Devon, England as the son of a Royal Navy Commander R.T. Haverfield, and his wife, née Ross. He emigrated to Australia in 1838 where he went droving cattle from Albury to Melbourne, working an alluvial claim near Bendigo, and started the Bendigo Advertiser with A.M. Lloyd (which he later sold to Mackay).

It became a daily on 1 July 1878, and continued until 31 March 1956, before reverting to a tri-weekly issue. In 1880 it was one of only two daily provincial newspapers circulated in New South Wales.

In 1995 the Riverine Herald first provided local call Internet access to its community.

Note/Correction: Local Call internet access was provided to the community by The Riverine Herald's parent company, the McPherson Media Group by their Internet Service Provider, McPherson Media. That particular arm of the group is to try and demonstrate media and news on all platforms, print, web and mobile. More info can be found at http://www.mcmedia.com.au.

== Staff ==
In the same year as founding Riverine Herald as Echuca's first newspaper, Robert Ross married Marianna Collier.

Newspaper proprietor and politician, Angus Mackay was born on 26 January 1824 in Aberdeen, Scotland. He had worked as a headmaster in Sydney prior to buying Haverfield's share in the Bendigo Advertiser and later helping to start The Riverine Herald.

Journalist and short story writer William Astley (1854–1911) had work published by the Herald.

== Editorial campaigns ==
The Riverine Herald has championed many causes throughout its history. These included calls for the de-snagging the Murray River so that it would be navigable, and the construction of weirs on it to assist irrigation which has made this one of Australia's major food bowl regions. The paper has also pushed for more environmental awareness with its "Minding the Murray" campaign and more recently played a pivotal role in Echuca Regional Health securing funding for a new Echuca Hospital.

== Archives ==
- The Echuca Historical Society at the corner of Dickson and Warren streets, Echuca, holds microfilm archival copies going back to 1863. Likewise the holdings for the Swan Hill Genealogical & Historical Society spans 1869 to 1884.
- Microfilm archives of the newspaper held at the State Library of Victoria spans uninterrupted from 1 July 1863 to 31 December 1997.

== Digitisation ==
The paper has been digitised as part of the Australian Newspapers Digitisation Program project of the National Library of Australia.
