= Rutherglen Football Club (1893) =

Rutherglen

Names
- Full name: Rutherglen Football Club
- Nickname: Redlegs

Club details
- Founded: 1877; 149 years ago
- Dissolved: 1979; 47 years ago (merged with Corowa FC to form "Corowa-Rutherglen FC")
- Colours
- Competition: Ovens & Murray Football League
- Premierships: (15): 1895, 1896, 1898, 1899, 1901, 1903, 1904, 1907, 1909, 1910, 1912, 1914, 1915, 1935, 1954
- Ground: Barkly Park, Rutherglen, Victoria

Uniforms
Home

Other information
- Official website: Rutherglen FNC website

The Rutherglen Football Club was an Australian rules football club based in Rutherglen, Victoria, being a founding member of the Ovens & Murray Football League in 1893. In 1979, the club merged with Corowa to form the Corowa-Rutherglen FC, joining the Ovens & Murray Football League.

== History ==
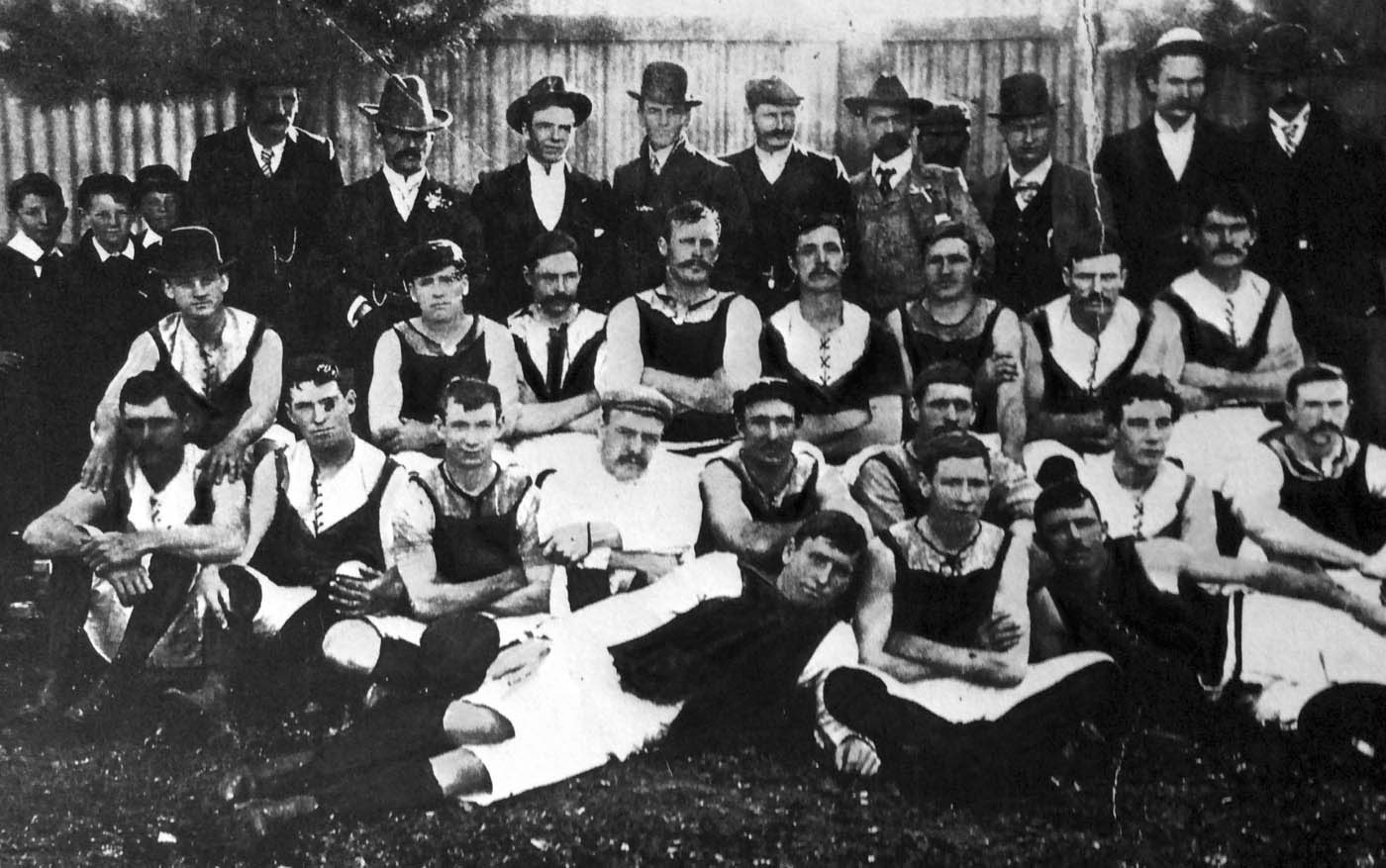
Rutherglen team in early 1900s

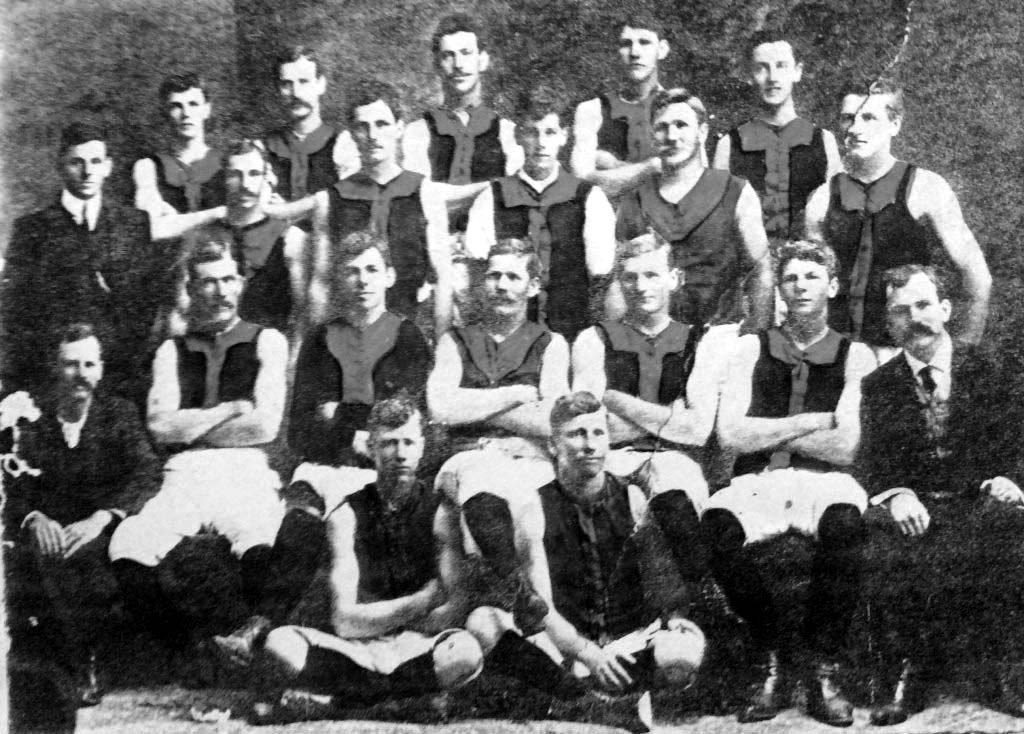
1907 - O&MFA Premiers: Rutherglen FC

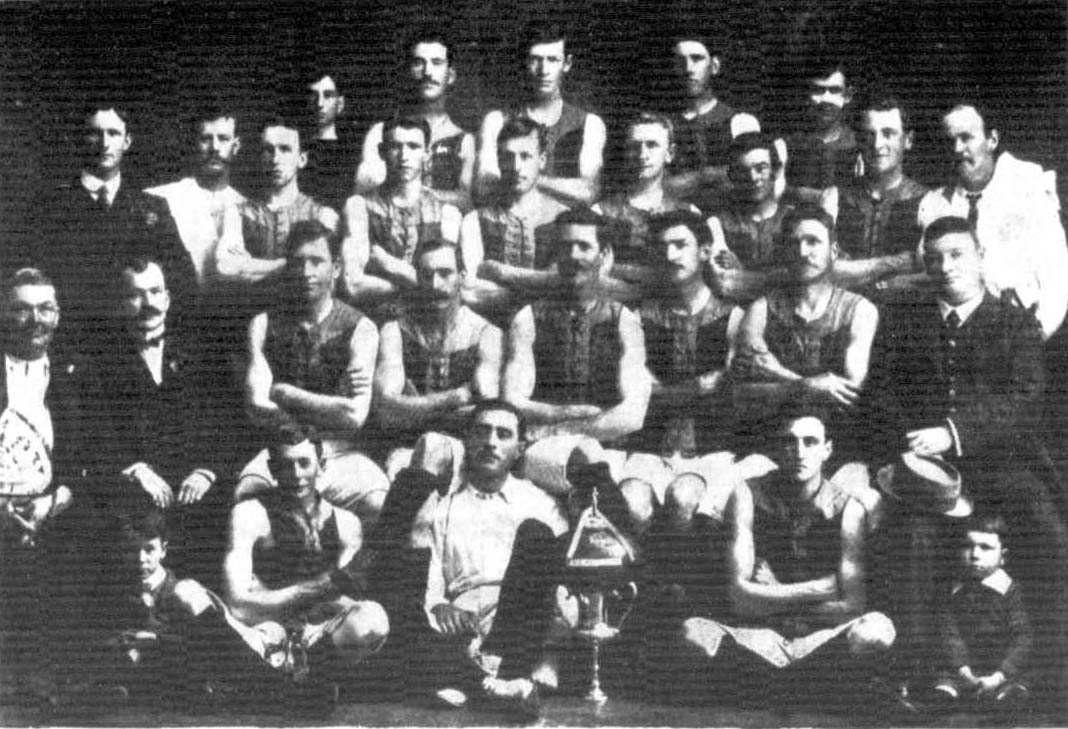
1912 - Rutherglen & DFA Premiers: Rutherglen FC

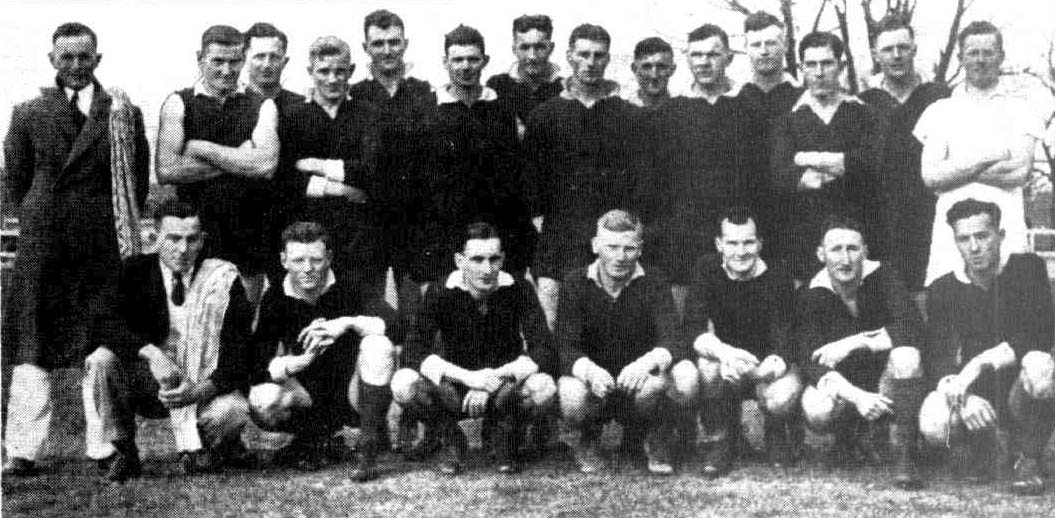
1939 - Rutherglen FC team photo

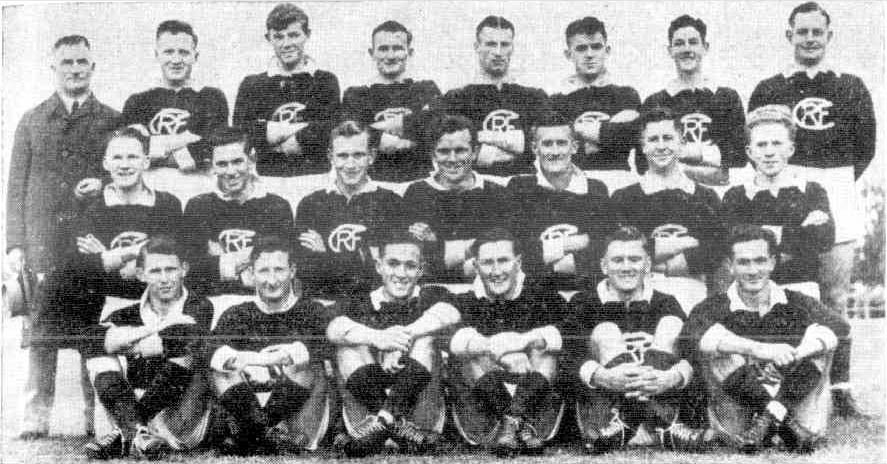
1948 - Rutherglen FC team photo

The origins of the Rutherglen FC appears to have been established in 1877, with Mr. Thomas Reeve Junior acting as club secretary. When Rutherglen played Border United FC in August 1877, they wore a navy blue jumper, with Thomas Reeve elected as captain. In 1885, Rutherglen played Murray FC (Yarrawonga) for the Richards / Mitchell Cup, with both teams winning one game each.

In 1888, Rutherglen President, Mr. G Graham JP donated a gold locket and six bangles to the best player for the season.

Rutherglen would go onto play many friendly matches against other local clubs up until 1892, when they joined the newly formed Ovens And Murray Football Association in 1893.

Rutherglen was one of the six founding clubs of the Ovens And Murray Football Association (O&MFL) in 1893. Rutherglen uniform consisted of a navy blue with a white monogrammed "RFC" jersey along with white shorts and red socks for the majority of their history.

The club was based at Rutherglen's "Barkly Park" located just off Reid Street & just north-west of the town's center and was named Barkly Park in May, 1895 at a Trustees' Meeting in recognition of the pioneer name given to the western end of Rutherglen and named after the former Victorian Governor, Sir Henry Barkly.

It was a powerhouse in the league during its early days competing in many finals, winning seven premierships between 1893 and 1906. Such was the strength of the Rutherglen Football Club during the Gold Rush era, many VFL teams challenged this successful country club and were defeated. During this era, six of the famous King brothers played for the club.

In 1907 Lake Moodemere and Rutherglen FC merged just prior to the start of the 1907 O&MFA season and were then known as Rutherglen FC.

In 1910, the O&MFA had only three teams – Albury, Excelsior and Rutherglen with Rutherglen winning the premiership.

Then in 1911, both Excelsior and Rutherglen applied to enter the Rutherglen and District Football Association. As a result, the O&MFL folded, with local teams attempting to apply to play in the Rutherglen & DFA. A ballot took place at a Rutherglen & DFA meeting on 29 April at Mackay's Hotel, Rutherglen which resulted in Balldale, North Albury, Rutherglen, South Albury and Wodonga being refused admission to join the association. Corowa, Excelsior and Lake Rovers were club's that were admitted. In 1911, the Albury Football Club was planning to divide the club into South Albury and North Albury teams, but as they were not admitted into the Rutherglen & DFA, the club went into recess in 1911. Rutherglen FC also went into recess in 1911.

Albury FC and Rutherglen FC were admitted into the Rutherglen & DFA in 1912.

In 1913, the Rutherglen & DFA consisting of the following teams – Albury, Balldale, Border United, Howlong, Lake Rovers and Rutherglen, with Albury defeating Rutherglen in the grand final at the Albury Sportground.

The competition reformed under the Ovens & Murray Football Association banner again in 1914, involving the following five teams: Albury, Border United, Howlong, Lake Rovers and Rutherglen. Balldale FC entered the Coreen & District Football League in 1914.

Rutherglen competed in the O&MFA in 1915, alongside six other local teams, prior to the O&MFA going into recess from 1916 to 1918, due to World War One.

In 1919, Rutherglen entered a "junior" team in the Chiltern & District Football Association, wore the green and gold colours and played their home games on the Christmastown ground. Rutherglen also competed in the O&MFA in 1919 too. Rutherglen lost their 1919 Chiltern & DFA semi final to eventual premiers, Wahgunyah.

In 1924, Lake Rovers FC merged with Rutherglen FC and remained in the O&MFL as Rutherglen and Harry C Kerley from Port Melbourne was appointed as coach.

As a result of the merger with Lake Rovers in 1924, Rutherglen Rovers Football Club was established and entered a team in the Chiltern & District Football Association between 1924 and 1933. Rutherglen Rovers were runners up in 1929 and 1932.

The Rutherglen's Seconds side was established in 1950, initially playing 3 season in the Coreen & District Football League before joining the newly established Ovens & Murray Football League Seconds competition in 1953. Ever since all lower sides of the Rutherglen Football Club have competed in the same league as the Senior side.

In April, 1954, Rutherglen footballer, Jack Hayes won the Stawell Gift, coached by Jack King.

The club went on to win a record 15th Premiership in 1954, which has only been equaled by Wangaratta Rovers (in 1994) & Albury (in 1997). Following the 1978 season both the Rutherglen Reglegs & Corowa Spiders merged and since 1979 have competed as Corowa-Rutherglen Roos in the Ovens & Murray Football League.

Many Rutherglen players went on to play VFL football including Fred Hiskins (Essendon), Rupert Hiskins (Carlton), Arthur & Stan Hiskins (South Melbourne), Bill Francis (Fitzroy) and Hassa Mann (Melbourne). Greg Tate, came from (Essendon) also played football for Rutherglen with Tate coaching the 1954 premiership team.

When Australian Rules Football really took off in the 1890s in the North East of Victoria and Rutherglen was still a booming gold mining town, a number of local clubs were formed. Some of these former clubs played in local football competitions and either merged with the Rutherglen FC or later folded and are all listed below and formed a valuable part of the local grass roots football history of the Rutherglen district. Remarkably in 1905, four of the five teams in the O&MFA were based in and around Rutherglen - Excelsior, Lake Rovers, Great Southern and Rutherglen and the fifth club was a Corowa and Wahgunyah based team, Border United.

Lilliput Football Club - 1889 to 1895

Lilliput FC appears to of commenced in 1889. Lilliput FC played in the Ovens & Murray Football Association in 1894 (finished 4th) and 1895. Although they forfeited their first game to Rutherglen in 1895, then disbanded.

In 1899, Lilliput FC entered a team in the Ovens & Murray Junior Football Association and played in this competition until 1903.

Great Northern Football Club - 1893

In May 1893, a meeting was held at Hick's Hotel and the Great Northern FC was formed with B Hicks elected as president and J Hicks, Treasurer. They proposed to enter a team in the Ovens & Murray Football Association, but for what ever reason, never did.

United Miners Football Club - 1894 to 1895 & 1913 to 1914.

In March 1894, a meeting was held at Hick's Hotel for the purpose of forming a football club at the Great Northern Mine near Rutherglen. United Miners played in the Ovens & Murray Football League (O&MFA) in 1894 and 1895. At the 1896 O&MFA Annual General Meeting, Excelsior FC replaced United Miners FC in the competition.

United Miners FC re-formed in 1911, after Rutherglen FC were refused entry into the Rutherglen & District Football Association and played the Rutherglen & District Football Association in 1911 and 1912, then played in the Chiltern & District Football Association from 1912 to 1914, when they folded

Excelsior Football Club - 1896 to 1906 & 1908 to 1912

The Excelsior FC was formed in 1896 and was basically a miner's team that was based at The Prentice Freehold Mine near Rutherglen. Excelsior FC defeated Border United FC in the play off for the 1900 O&MFA premiership. In 1907 at an O&MFA Delegates meeting, Excelsior was voted out of the competition, which seemed strange, as it left an odd number of teams (seven) in the competition. Excelsior returned to the O&MFA competition in 1908 when they replaced the Great Southern FC and played there until 1912, when they ultimately folded prior to the 1913 season. In 1911 the United Miners FC reformed and entered a team in the Chiltern & District Football Association from 1913 to 1915.

Great Southern Football Club - 1899 to 1902, 1905 to 1907 and 1912 to 1913

The Great Southern FC was accepted into the Ovens & Murray Football League in 1899 and played there until 1902. They had a second stint in the O&MFA between 1905 and 1907. The Great Southern FC re-formed in 1912 and played in the Chiltern & District Football Association in 1912 and 1913.

Lake Moodemere Football Club - 1903 to 1906 & 1909 to 1910

Lake Moodemere FC was established in 1903 and joined the Ovens & Murray Football League (O&MFA) and initially played on the property of A and L Chandler. The club initially wore a blue guernsey with a cardinal (vivid red) sash. Lake Moodemere won O&MFA premierships in 1905 and 1906. In 1907, Lake Moodemere merged with Rutherglen FC and entered the O&MFA as Rutherglen FC and won the premiership. After the merger in 1907, Rutherglen went onto play in every grand final between 1907 and 1915. The only year they did not play in the grand final was in 1911, when they were refused entry into the Rutherglen & District FA.

In 1909 and 1910, Lake Moodemere FC entered a junior team in the Ovens & Murray Junior Football Association. Lake Moodemere defeated Howlong in the 1910 grand final to win the premiership.

Lake Rovers Football Club - 1911 to 1915, 1919 to 1923.

The Lake Rovers FC was established in 1911 and initially competed in the Rutherglen & District Football Association from 1911 to 1913, then joined the O&MFA in 1914 and 1915. After a three-year break due to the World War One, they re-joined the O&MFA in 1919. When the O&MFA went into recess in 1920, Lake Rovers joined the Chiltern & District Football Association and were runners up to Springhurst in the grand final. Lake Rovers then returned to the O&MFA from 1921 to 1923. Lake Rovers FC then merged with Rutherglen FC in 1924. Lake Rovers won the 1919 O&MFA premiership and were runners up in 1915.

Mount Ophir Football Club - 1914

In April, 1914, a meeting was held at Hick's Advance Australia Hotel with the Mount Ophir Football Club being formed and having use of the Prentice Freehold ground. Mt. Ophir finished the 1914 Chiltern & District Football Association season as runners up to Chiltern in their one and only year in existence.

Rutherglen Rovers Football Club - 1924 to 1933.

This "seconds" club was established after the merger of Lake Rovers FC and Rutherglen FC in early 1924 and they played in the Chiltern & District Football Association between 1924 and 1933, playing in four consecutive grand finals between 1929 and 1932, winning premierships in 1930 and 1931.

== Football competition timeline ==
- 1877 - 1884: No formal competition, but did play friendly matches against other local towns.
- 1885: Richards / Mitchell Cup
- 1886 - 1892: No formal competition, but did play friendly matches against other local towns.
- 1893 - 1906: Ovens & Murray Football Association
- 1907 - 1910: Ovens & Murray Football Association. Rutherglen FC merged with Lake Moodermere FC in 1907.
- 1911: Club active, but did not play any in competition. Rutherglen & Albury were refused entry into the Rutherglen & DFA by club delegates in 1911.
- 1912 - 1913: Rutherglen & District Football Association
- 1914 & 1915: Ovens & Murray Football Association
- 1916 - 1918: O&M / Club in recess due to World War One
- 1919: Ovens & Murray Football Association
- 1920: Chiltern & District Football Association
- 1921 - 1923: Ovens & Murray Football Association
- 1924 - 1940: Ovens & Murray Football League. Club merged with Lake Rovers FC in 1924.
- 1941 - 1944: O&M / Club in recess due to World War Two
- 1945: Chiltern & District Football Association
- 1946 - 1978: Ovens & Murray Football League. Club merged with Corowa Football Club in 1979.
- 1979 - 2022: Ovens & Murray Football League. Club now known as Corowa Rutherglen Football Club.
- 2023: Corowa Rutherglen Football Club went into recess, due to a player shortage.
- 2024 - 2025: Ovens & Murray Football League.

== Football Premierships ==
=== Teams ===
Ovens & Murray Football League

- Rutherglen FC
  - Seniors (15): 1895, 1896, 1898, 1899, 1901, 1903, 1904, 1907, 1909, 1910, 1912, 1914, 1915, 1935, 1954
    - Minor (10): 1895, 1896, 1898, 1899, 1901, 1903, 1904, 1936, 1952, 1954

Chiltern & District Football Association

- Rutherglen Rovers FC
  - 1930, 1931

Defunct Rutherglen Club's Premierships

Ovens & Murray Football League

- Excelsior FC
  - Seniors: 1900
- Lake Moodemere FC
  - Seniors (2): 1905, 1906
- Lake Rovers FC
  - Seniors (1): 1919

== Football runners up ==
Ovens & Murray Football League

- Rutherglen FC
  - Seniors (7): 1893, 1894, 1897, 1908, 1913, 1936, 1952
- Lake Rovers FC
  - 1915

Chiltern & District Football Association

- Lake Rovers FC
  - 1920
- Rutherglen Rovers FC
  - 1929, 1932

== Individual awards ==
- O&MFL Senior Best & Fairest - "Morris Medal" (6):
  - 1936 (Alan McCauley)
  - 1939 (W "Bill" Francis)
  - 1946 (Alan Dunn)
  - 1950 (Alan Dunn)
  - 1951 (Norm Hawking)
  - 1977 (Ken Boundy)
- O&MFL Reserves Best & Fairest - "Ralf Marks Award" (2):
  - 1957 - (Norm Hawking)
  - 1959 - (D. McQuade)
- O&MFL - Century Goal Kicker (1):
  - 1952 (Kevin Gleeson) 106 goals

== Football coaches ==
- 1897 - H Garnham (captain)
- 1924 - Harry C Kerley
- 1925 - Wilfred Stott
- 1926 - Jim Caldwell
- 1927 - Fred Hiskins, Lou Jackson, Jack King
- 1932 - W B Scott
- 1935 - 1937: Jack Hiskins
- 1947 - ?
- 1948 - G Robbins
- 1949 - 1951: Keith Williams
- 1952 - 1955: Greg Tate
- 1956 - Clive Philp
- 1962 - 1965 - Bob Hay
- 1966 - Ray Horwood
- 1968 - 1970:Frank Hodgkin
- 1970 - 1972:Clem Goonan
- 1972 - Robert Hodgkin
- 1975 - 1978: Vin Doolan

== Notable players ==
=== VFL/AFL players ===
The following footballers played with Rutherglen prior to playing VFL football. The year indicates their VFL debut.

- 1899 - Bill Collins - Carlton (1899–1900)
- 1899 - Harry Evans - Carlton (1899 - 1901)
- 1900 - Fred Hiskins - Essendon (1900-1902; 1906)
- 1900 - Joe Sullivan - Carlton (1900-1903)
- 1901 - Lou Jackson - South Melbourne (1901–1902)
- 1902 - Jim King - South Melbourne (1902–03) & St Kilda (1904–05)
- 1902 - Alf Trevillian - St Kilda (1902-1903; 1906)
- 1904 - Jim Hallahan Sr. - St Kilda (1904)
- 1904 - Jack King - St Kilda (1904)
- 1904 - Jimmy Roberts - Geelong (1904)
- 1906 - William Harry - Carlton (1906)
- 1908 - Doug Hill - St Kilda (1908)
- 1908 - Arthur Hiskins - South Melbourne (1908-1915; 1919–1923)
- 1911 - Arthur Francis - Fitzroy (1911)
- 1911 - Charlie McMillan - Fitzroy (1911)
- 1913 - Stan Hiskins - South Melbourne (1913–1914; 1919–1921)
- 1920 - Rupe Hiskins - Carlton (1920-1924)
- 1921 - George Robbins - Carlton (1921)
- 1924 - Percy Rowe - Collingwood (1924).
- 1924 - Bobby Ewer - Melbourne (1924–25)
- 1929 - Clarrie Hearn - Essendon (1929-1935)
- 1929 - Neville Huggins - Fitzroy (1929) & North Melbourne (1931-1935)
- 1932 - Tom Hallahan - Collingwood (1932) & St Kilda (1933-1934)
- 1934 - Jack Hiskins - Essendon (1934-1935)
- 1935 - Jim Hallahan Jr. - Footscray (1935-1937) & Fitzroy (1942-1944)
- 1948 - Keith Williams - Fitzroy (1948)
- 1953 - Kevin Gleeson - Richmond (1953)
- 1956 - Colin Crampton - North Melbourne (1956–1957)
- 1959 - Hugh Earnshaw - Geelong (1959)
- 1959 - Hassa Mann - Melbourne (1959-1968)
- 1963 - Ted Potter - Collingwood (1963-1972)
- 1964 - Reg Edwards - South Melbourne (1964)
- 1965 - Ken Baker - St Kilda (1965–1966)
- 1971 - Phil Baker - North Melbourne & Geelong (1971-1979)
- 1972 - Michael Hawking - North Melbourne (1972)

The following footballers came to Rutherglen FC from the VFL.

- 1924 - Harry C Kerley
- 1925 - Wilfred Stott
- 1926 - Jim Caldwell
- 1947 - Greg Tate - Essendon (1947-1951)
- 1948 - Clive Philp - Hawthorn (1948–1955)
- 1951 - Ron Bywater - South Melbourne (1942–50)
- 1961 - Clem Goonan - South Melbourne (1961–1964)
- 1968 - Frank Hodgkin - St Kilda (1961–1962)

== Team of the Century (1903–2003) ==
Team of the Century
B:	Frank King	Denis Sandral	Lou Jackson ^{5}
HB:	W. "Bill" Francis	Jim Sandral	John "Juice" Kingston
C:	Alan Dunn	W. "Bill" Gayfer	W. "Chic" O'Donoghue ^{3}
HF:	D. "Dinny" Carroll ^{2}	Norm Hawking	George Tobias ^{1}
F:	Arthur Francis	Ray "Nana" Baker	Alan McCauley
Foll:	Mark Mills ^{4}	Jack King	John Clancy
Int:	John Lane	Alan Way	Carl Dickins
Coach:	Peter Tossol		

Team reference

- Border United (1877 - 1905, 1914 - 1919, 1944 - 1947)
- Corowa (1906 - 1913, 1920 to 1943, 1948 - 78)
- Rutherglen (1903–78)
- Corowa-Rutherglen (1979–2003)

Notes

- ^{1} George Tobias played mainly with the Corowa FC. He was also a foundation player for the Corowa-Rutherglen FC in 1979
- ^{2} Dinny Carroll also played with the Border United FC in 1947.
- ^{3} W Chic O'Donoghue also played with the Border United FC in 1946 and 1947.
- ^{4} Mark Mills played with Corowa FC and Corowa / Rutherglen FC.
- ^{5} Lou Jackson played mainly with Rutherglen FC, but also played with Border United FC in 1900 and with Lake Rovers in 1911.

== See also ==
- Rutherglen Football Club
- Corowa Football Club
- Corowa-Rutherglen Football Club
