= Hallahan =

Hallahan is a surname. Notable people with the surname include:

- Bill Hallahan (1902–1981), American left-handed pitcher in Major League Baseball
- Cathriona Hallahan (born 1964/1965), Irish business executive and the managing director of Microsoft Ireland
- Charles Hallahan (1943–1997), American actor
- Jim Hallahan Jr. (1911–1994), Australian rules footballer, played for the Footscray and the Fitzroy Football Club
- Jim Hallahan Sr. (1878–1964), Australian rules footballer, played for the St Kilda Football Club
- Kay Hallahan (born 1941), former deputy leader of the Western Australian branch of the Australian Labor Party
- Margaret Hallahan (born 1803), English Catholic nun, foundress of the Dominican Congregation of St. Catherine of Siena
- Mike Hallahan (born 1949), Australian rules footballer, played for the Fitzroy Football Club
- Mitch Hallahan (born 1992), Australian rules footballer, played for the Hawthorn and the Gold Coast Football Club
- William H. Hallahan (1925–2018), American Edgar-award-winning novelist
- Tom Hallahan (1908–1997), Australian rules footballer, played for the Collingwood and St Kilda Football Club

== See also ==
- J. W. Hallahan Catholic Girls High School, Roman Catholic high school in Philadelphia, Pennsylvania, USA
