= Arthur Francis (footballer) =

Australian rules footballer

Personal information
- Full name: Arthur John Francis
- Born: 4 December 1886; Wahgunyah, Victoria
- Died: 15 October 1952 (aged 65); Rutherglen, Victoria
- Original team: Rutherglen (O&MFL)
- Height: 177 cm (5 ft 10 in)

Playing career^{1}
Years	Club	Games (Goals)
1911	Fitzroy	1 (0)
- ^{1} Playing statistics correct to the end of 1911.

Arthur John Francis (4 December 1886 – 15 October 1952) was an Australian rules footballer who played for the Fitzroy Football Club in the Victorian Football League (VFL).

In 2003, Francis was named in the Rutherglen Football Club's Team of the Century.
