= Jack Hiskins =

Australian rules footballer, born 1911

Personal information
- Born: 12 February 1911; Rutherglen, Victoria
- Died: 16 March 1973 (aged 62); Wodonga, Victoria
- Original team: Rutherglen
- Height: 188 cm (6 ft 2 in)
- Weight: 81 kg (179 lb)

Playing career^{1}
Years	Club	Games (Goals)
1934–1935	Essendon	16 (7)
- ^{1} Playing statistics correct to the end of 1935.

Jack Hiskins (12 February 1911 – 16 March 1973) was an Australian rules footballer who played with Essendon in the Victorian Football League (VFL).

== Career ==
A half-back, Hiskins started his career in the Ovens & Murray Football League, with Rutherglen in 1930. He joined Essendon in the 1934 VFL season and made 13 appearances that year. After playing for Essendon in the opening three rounds of the 1935 season, Hiskins returned to Rutherglen.

Hiskins was captain-coach of their 1935 premiership team, which defeated Border United in the grand final He steered them to another grand final in 1936, but this time they finished on the losing team, unable to defeat Wangaratta.

== Family ==
Fred Hiskins, Jack's father, was a half forward for Essendon and won the VFL Leading Goal-kicker award in 1901.

His father was one of four brothers who played league football, with the others being Arthur, Rupe and Stan.
