= Jim Hallahan =

Jim Hallahan may refer to:

- Jim Hallahan Sr. (1878–?), Australian rules footballer
- Jim Hallahan Jr. (born 1911), Australian rules footballer, son of the above
- Jim Hallahan (motorsport), member of Canadian Motorsport Hall of Fame
- Jim Hallahan (basketball), College basketball coach, 1981–82 NCAA Division I men's basketball season

== See also ==
- Hallahan (surname)
