= Jack King (footballer, born 1879) =

Australian rules footballer

Personal information
- Full name: John King
- Born: 15 January 1879; Rutherglen, Victoria
- Died: 25 June 1965 (aged 86); Rutherglen, Victoria
- Original team: Rutherglen

Playing career^{1}
Years	Club	Games (Goals)
1904	St Kilda	8 (0)
- ^{1} Playing statistics correct to the end of 1904.

Career highlights
- Inducted into the Stawell Gift Hall of Fame; Played in 11 O&MFL Premiership with Rutherglen; 2003 – Rutherglen – Team of the Century; 2008: O&MFL Hall of Fame

John King (15 January 1879 – 25 June 1965) was an Australian rules footballer who was recruited from the Rutherglen Football Club and played with St Kilda in the Victorian Football League (VFL).

== Family ==
One of the nine children of the vigneron Daniel King (1827–1903), and Ellen King (1844–1923), née Slattery, John King was born at Rutherglen, Victoria on 15 January 1879.

King was the older brother of James Bernard "Jim" King (1873–1929), the former South Melbourne and St. Kilda player, and of Christopher King (1883–1980), winner of the 1908 Stawell Gift.

== Football ==
King played 26 years of senior football in the Ovens and Murray Football League, playing in 11 premierships with Rutherglen, and was inducted into the O&MFL – Hall of Fame in 2008.

== Professional athlete ==
=== Sprinter ===
Starting off an official handicap of 13 yards, he was a finalist in the 1907 Stawell Gift. With the field on their marks, he broke twice and was penalized another two yards. He came fourth.

=== Coach ===
King, who "had a cinders track [on his Rutherglen farm] that replicated the exact gradient of the rise at Stawell", become a four-time Stawell Gift winning athletic coach: his younger brother, Chris King (1908), Clarrie Hearn (1929), Frank Bradley (1937), and Jack Hayes (1954). He also "helped" the 1952 winner, Lance Mann; and, later, convinced dual Stawell Gift winner (1966 and 1967) Bill Howard to take up professional running in 1964.

== Stawell Gift's Hall of Fame ==
King was inducted into the Stawell Gift – Hall of Fame.
