= Arthur Hiskins =

Australian rules footballer (1886–1971)

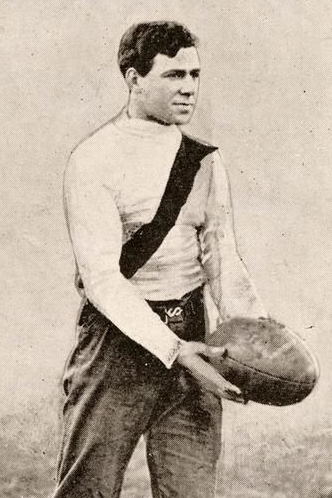
- Hiskins in 1910

Personal information
- Full name: Arthur Hiskins
- Born: 9 September 1886; Wahgunyah, Victoria
- Died: 23 October 1971 (aged 85); Bentleigh, Victoria
- Original team: Rutherglen
- Height: 178 cm (5 ft 10 in)
- Weight: 76 kg (168 lb)

Playing career^{1}
Years	Club	Games (Goals)
1908–1915, 1919–1923	South Melbourne	185 (56)

Coaching career
Years	Club	Games (W–L–D)
1920	South Melbourne	16 (7–9–0)
- ^{1} Playing statistics correct to the end of 1923.

Arthur 'Poddy' Hiskins (9 September 1886 – 23 October 1971) was an Australian rules footballer who played with South Melbourne in the Victorian Football League (VFL).

== Family ==
One of fourteen children, and the son of John Hiskins (1853–1946) and Emma Hiskins (1856–1934), née Thompson, Arthur Hiskins was born in Wahgunyah, Victoria, on 9 September 1886. He married Annie Wilhelmina "Minnie" Bett (1897–1986) in 1927.

Three of his eight brothers also played senior VFL football: Fred Hiskins (1878–1946), played 50 games with Essendon, Stanley Hiskins (1890–1974), 66 games with South Melbourne, and Rupert Hiskins (1893–1976), 74 games with Carlton. His nephew, Jack Hiskins, Fred's son, played 16 games with Essendon.

== Football ==
Recruited from Rutherglen Football Club, Hiskins was a versatile player who was usually used in defence but sometimes pushed up forward. He could kick the ball long distances, and was one of the faster players in the side.

=== Player (South Melbourne) ===
He made his debut on 2 May 1908, against Fitzroy, at the age of 21. He played 185 senior games, kicked 56 goals, and retired, aged 37, at the end of 1923, having played at full-back in the 1923 Preliminary Final (also against Fitzroy).

Over his career, he played in six Semi-Finals, three Preliminary Finals, and one Grand Final, selected at centre half-forward, in the 1909 premiership team.

He did not play in 1916, 1917, and 1918 due to his war service. He immediately resumed his career, upon his discharge from the army (on 1 September 1919), in the match against Carlton on 6 September 1919.

=== Representative player ===
In 1913, he was selected to represent the VFL in a match against a combined Ballarat Football League team on 5 July 1913; he was replaced by Bill Eastick.

=== Captain-coach (South Melbourne) ===
He was captain-coach of South Melbourne in 1920.

=== Goal Umpire ===
Hiskins officiated in 52 league games as a goal umpire from 1930 to 1933.

=== Tribunal ===
He was reported twice; and was suspended on each occasion.

- 1912: 31 August 1912 (round 18) — reported by VFL steward Fred Fontaine for striking Collingwood's Ted Rowell, he was suspended for 4 matches: "the investigation committee held that the charge … [of] striking Rowell … was sustained by the evidence, and that being so, they rightly determined that the pugilistic tendency [of Hiskens] should be checked by rustication" (The Leader, 14 September 1912).
- 1914: 6 June 1914 (round 7) — reported, again by Fred Fontaine, for striking Richmond's Ted Farrell, he was suspended for the rest of the season (i.e., 13 matches).

== Military service ==
Hiskins enlisted in the First AIF in October 1916, and was discharged in September 1919.

== Death ==
He died on 23 October 1971.
