= Doug Hill =

Doug Hill may refer to:

- Doug Hill (meteorologist), American television meteorologist
- Doug Hill (footballer) (1884–1968), Australian rules footballer
