= Lou Jackson (footballer) =

Australian rules footballer

Personal information
- Full name: Joseph Louis Jackson
- Born: 25 November 1875; Rutherglen, Victoria
- Died: 23 July 1943 (aged 67); Norong, Victoria
- Original teams: Rutherglen, Border United, Lake Rovers (O&MFL)
- Position: Ruckman

Playing career^{1}
Years	Club	Games (Goals)
1901–02	South Melbourne	8 (1)
- ^{1} Playing statistics correct to the end of 1902.

Joseph Louis Jackson (25 November 1875 – 23 July 1943) was an Australian rules footballer who played with South Melbourne in the Victorian Football League (VFL).

In August, 1901, the Argus newspaper wrote that Jackson "follows in fine form, plays a perfect fair game, marks well, is quick on his feet and kicks well".

Jackson played many years with Rutherglen, prior to playing with Border United in the Ovens & Murray Football League in 1901, prior to heading south to play with South Melbourne in 1901 and 1902.

In 1907, Jackson was President of the Ovens & Murray Football League.

Jackson was selected in Corowa Rutherglen Team of the Century in the back pocket in 2003.
