= Charlie McMillan =

Australian rules footballer

Personal information
- Full name: Charles Frederick McMillan
- Born: 27 December 1887; Wahgunyah, Victoria
- Died: 11 December 1911 (aged 23); Corowa, New South Wales
- Original team: Rutherglen (O&MFA)
- Height: 179 cm (5 ft 10 in)

Playing career^{1}
Years	Club	Games (Goals)
1911	Fitzroy	8 (4)
- ^{1} Playing statistics correct to the end of 1911.

Charles Frederick McMillan (27 December 1887 – 11 December 1911) was an Australian rules footballer who played with Fitzroy in the Victorian Football League (VFL).

McMillan died from cancer in Corowa, New South Wales in 1911, aged 23.
