= Dick Fitzgerald (Australian footballer) =

Australian rules footballer

Personal information
- Full name: Richard Patrick Fitzgerald
- Born: 14 March 1889; Rutherglen, Victoria
- Died: 12 January 1957 (aged 67); Corowa, New South Wales
- Original teams: Balldale, Lake Rovers, Wangaratta, Albury
- Height: 187 cm (6 ft 2 in)
- Weight: 89 kg (196 lb)

Playing career^{1}
Years	Club	Games (Goals)
1913	South Melbourne	2 (0)
- ^{1} Playing statistics correct to the end of 1913.

Dick "Tiny" Fitzgerald (14 March 1889 – 12 January 1957) was an Australian rules footballer who played with South Melbourne in the Victorian Football League (VFL).

Fitzgerald made his debut with South Melbourne in 1913 alongside his Lake Rovers Football Club teammate, Stan Hiskins in round one.

Fitzgerald played with Corowa in 1914 and then returned to the Lake Rovers Football Club in the Ovens and Murray Football League and remained with them during world War One. He later coached Balldale.
