= Brad Campbell =

Brad Campbell may refer to:

- Brad C. Campbell (born 1975), former Australian rules footballer for St Kilda
- Brad L. Campbell (born 1975), former Australian rules footballer for Melbourne
- Bradley M. Campbell (born 1961), American attorney and politician
