= Corowa-Rutherglen Football Club =

Australian rules football and netball club

Corowa-Rutherglen

Names
- Full name: Corowa-Rutherglen Football Netball Club
- Nickname: Kangaroos

Club details
- Founded: 1979; 47 years ago
- Colours
- Competition: Ovens & Murray Football League
- President: Graham Hosier
- Premierships: (2): 2000, 2003
- Ground: John Foord Oval

Uniforms
Home

Other information
- Official website: corowarutherglenfnc.com.au

The Corowa-Rutherglen Football Netball Club, nicknamed the Kangaroos, is an Australian rules football and netball club based in the town of Corowa in New South Wales. Corowa-Rutherglen's football and netball squads formerly played in the Ovens & Murray Football League.

The club is notable for producing many VFL / AFL football players over many years, including John Longmire.

== History ==
The club was formed in 1979 when the Corowa Spiders and the Rutherglen Redlegs merged to become the "Corowa-Rutherglen Roos".

Additionally surplus players formed the Rutherglen-Corowa Cats in 1979 and competed in the Coreen & District Football League for 13 seasons, before moving to the Ovens & King Football League for 11 seasons. Today the club is known as the Rutherglen Cats, dropping "Corowa" from their name in 2002, and have competed in the Tallangatta & District Football League since 2004.

In the 2016 Ovens & Murray FNL season it was announced that the Corowa-Rutherglen FNC would move the round 11 home match to Rutherglen's Barkley Park. This marked the first time a match was played in Rutherglen for premiership points since the 1981 Ovens & Murray FL season. Traditionally the Rutherglen Cats do not play on the Queen's Birthday Weekend as the town hosts the annual Winery Walkabout.

Accompanying the return was a pre-match luncheon with many guest speakers, including Rutherglen O&M Hall of Famer Bill Gayfer, Mick Gayfer, John Pearce, Corowa-Rutherglen's O&M Hall of Famer Jim Sandral, Dennis Sandral, John Clancy, and Peter Chisnall. At the luncheon it was suggested by Corowa-Rutherglen official Fred Longmire that both the Corowa-Rutherglen FNC & Rutherglen FNC could be run by a one-commission model, which would include three representatives from both clubs, an independent chairperson and a paid general manager to run 12 football and nine netball teams in the O&M and T&D football leagues.

Year	G	B	Pts	Home	G	B	Pts	Away	Report
2016	6	11	47	Corowa-Rutherglen	10	6	68	Wodonga	Report (Saturday June 11)

== Premierships ==
- Ovens & Murray Football League
  - Seniors (2): 2000, 2003
  - Seconds (2): 1986, 1992
  - Thirds (3): 1983, 1984, 2000
- Seniors (1): 1979 - O&MFL Pre Season Premiership

== VFL / AFL players ==
The following players played with CRFNC prior to making their VFL / AFL senior football debut or were drafted to an AFL club.

- 1981 - Darryl Henderson - North Melbourne
- 1986 - Michael Gayfer - Collingwood
- 1988 - John Longmire - North Melbourne
- 1988 - Brett MacKenzie - North Melbourne
- 1988 - Mark O'Donoghue - North Melbourne
- 1994 - Damian Houlihan - Collingwood
- 1995 - Jeff Bruce - Fitzroy
- 1997 - Brad Campbell - St Kilda
- 1997 - Adam Houlihan - Geelong
- 1997 - Ben Mathews - Sydney
- 2000 - Ryan Houlihan - Carlton
- 2000 - Aaron Henneman - Essendon
- 2001- David Teague - North Melbourne
- 2002 - Robert Campbell - Hawthorn
- 1982 - Craig Horwood - Collingwood Played no senior AFL games
- 1986 - Paul Bartlett - North Melbourne Played no senior AFL games
- 1993 - Paul Lewis - Geelong Played no senior AFL games
- 1999 - Adam Mathews - Carlton Played no senior AFL games
- 2001 - Joshua Houlihan - St Kilda Played no senior AFL games

=== Team of the Century (1903–2003) ===
Team of the Century
B:	F. King	D. Sandral	L. Jackson
HB:	W. Francis	J. Sandral	J. Kingston
C:	A. Dunn	W. Gayfer	W. O'Donoghue
HF:	D. Carroll	N. Hawking	G. Tobias ^{1}
F:	A. Francis	R. Baker	A. McCauley
Foll:	M. Mills	J. King	J. Clancy
Int:	J. Lane	A. Way	C. Dickins
Coach:	P. Tossol		

Team ref

- Corowa (1903–78)
- Rutherglen (1903–78)
- Corowa-Rutherglen (1979–2003)

Notes

- ^{1} G. Tobias was named in the Team of the Century for his career with the Corowa FC. He was also a foundation player for the Corowa-Rutherglen FC in 1979

== See also ==
- Rutherglen Football Club (1893)
- Rutherglen Football Club
- Corowa Football Club
