= Frank Hodgkin =

Australian rules footballer

- Hodgkin during his St Kilda career

Personal information
- Born: 20 June 1941
- Died: 17 December 2017 (aged 76); Wodonga, Victoria
- Original team: Kergunyah
- Height: 179 cm (5 ft 10 in)
- Weight: 83 kg (183 lb)
- Position: Centre half-forward

Playing career^{1}
Years	Club	Games (Goals)
1961–1962	St Kilda	32 (21)
- ^{1} Playing statistics correct to the end of 1962.

Career highlights
- Myrtleford best and fairest – 1960 & 1963; Ganmain premierships – 1964 & 1965; Gammage Medal – 1967; Mitta United premiership coach – 1975

Frank D. Hodgkin (20 June 1941 – 17 December 2017) was an Australian rules footballer who played with St Kilda in the Victorian Football League (VFL).

Hodgkin, originally from Kergunyah in the Tallangatta & District Football League, debuting as a 14-year and playing in a premiership in 1955. Hodgkin started his Ovens & Murray Football League career at Myrtleford in 1957, aged 17 and represented the O&MFL against the South West Football League. Despite his young age, Hodgkin was chosen in the league's representative team in his debut season. After winning Myrtleford's best and fairest award in 1960, Hodgkin went to St Kilda for the 1961 VFL season.

He made an instant impression in a pre-season practice match when he traded punches with captain Neil Roberts, then later Eric Guy, the vice captain. He played 18 of a possible 19 games in 1961, including St Kilda's semi-final loss to Footscray. His performances that season earned him the "best first-year player" award. A centre half-forward, Hodgkin's spot in the team became less certain due to the emergence of Darrel Baldock.

In 1963 he returned to Myrtleford, where he won a second best and fairest.

From 1964 to 1967, Hodgkin played for Ganmain in the South Western District Football League and was a member of two premiership teams (1964 and 1965). He won the league's best and fairest award in 1966.

Rutherglen secured him as coach in 1968 and he remained in that position for three years.

Hodgkin played with North Albury from 1971 to 1974, then coached Mitta United to a premiership in the 1975 Tallangatta League season, in which he booted 120 goals. In 1976 he spent the year with Wodonga, before he had two season stints back at North Albury and Mitta United, retiring in 1980.

Hodgkin kicked 238 goals during his time in the O&MFL.

Hodgkin played 426 games of senior football over a 25-year period.

His younger brother, Robert, played for Fitzroy.

He died in 2017 at the age of 76.
