= Fred Hiskins =

Australian rules footballer

John Frederick Hiskins

Personal information
- Born: 8 August 1878; Rutherglen, Victoria
- Died: 25 November 1946 (aged 68); Rutherglen, Victoria
- Original teams: Excelsior (O&MFL), Rutherglen

Playing career^{1}
Years	Club	Games (Goals)
1900–02, 1906	Essendon	50 (78)
- ^{1} Playing statistics correct to the end of 1906.

Career highlights
- VFL premiership player: 1901; VFL Leading Goalkicker: 1901; Essendon leading goalkicker: 1901

John Frederick Hiskins (8 August 1878 – 25 November 1946) was an Australian rules footballer who played for Essendon in the Victorian Football League (VFL) during the early 1900s.

Hiskins came from a family of 16 and hailed from Lake Moodermere near Wahgunyah, Victoria.

Hiskins played in Excelsior's 1900 Ovens & Murray Football League premiership prior to making his VFL debut in round 15, 1900 against South Melbourne.

Hiskins was a half forward and topped the league's goalkicking in the 1901 VFL season with 34 goals, finishing the year in Essendon's premiership side. He would have kicked more that year had it not been for an inaccurate game against South Melbourne which saw him kick two goals and ten behinds.

Hiskins regularly used the place kick to shoot at goal and represented Victoria against South Australia in Adelaide in 1902.

After three years in Western Australia he returned to Essendon in 1906 and played one final season. Hiskins managed to squeeze in a game for Wahgunyah in June 1906.

Hiskins later played with Rutherglen in 1907, featuring in their 1907 Ovens & Murray Football League premiership.

His younger brothers Arthur, Rupe and Stan were also VFL footballers while his son Jack played for Essendon in the 1930s.
