= Harry Evans (Australian footballer) =

Australian rules footballer

Personal information
- Full name: Hector William Evans
- Born: 4 September 1879; Shepparton, Victoria
- Died: 23 February 1949 (aged 69); Barnawartha, Victoria
- Original teams: Rutherglen, Excelsior

Playing career^{1}
Years	Club	Games (Goals)
1899, 1901	Carlton	8 (2)
- ^{1} Playing statistics correct to the end of 1901.

Hector William "Harry" Evans (4 September 1879 – 23 February 1949) was an Australian rules footballer who played with Carlton in the Victorian Football League (VFL).

Evans returned to the Ovens & Murray Football League in 1900 and played in Excelsior's 1900 premiership.

== Family ==
The son of George Alexander Evans (1841–1887), and Emma Lythgoe Evans (1848–1922), née Lasslett, Hector William was born in Shepparton on 4 September 1879.

== Military service ==
He enlisted in the First AIF on 18 August 1914, and he served overseas in the 7th Australian Infantry Battalion. He sustained gunshot wounds to his left thigh and leg, on active service, that immediately required three operations; and, as well, he received treatment for the wounds' sequelae on several occasions post-war.

Although Evans had been allocated a block of land under the "Soldier Settlement Scheme", his service record shows that he surrendered the block in the second half of 1933.

== Death ==
He died at Barnawartha, Victoria on 23 February 1949.
