= Greg Tate (footballer) =

Australian rules footballer (1925–2010)

Personal information
- Full name: Gregory Herbert Tate
- Nickname: Spudda
- Born: 21 October 1925; Essendon, Victoria
- Died: 27 May 2010 (aged 84)
- Original team: North Essendon Methodists
- Height: 171 cm (5 ft 7 in)
- Weight: 67 kg (148 lb)
- Positions: Forward pocket, rover

Playing career^{1}
Years	Club	Games (Goals)
1947–1951	Essendon	70 (95)
- ^{1} Playing statistics correct to the end of 1951.

Gregory Herbert Tate (21 October 1925 – 27 May 2010) was an Australian rules footballer notable for playing with Essendon in the Victorian Football League.

== Football career ==
=== Essendon ===
Tate was recruited by Essendon before the 1947 VFL season from North Essendon Methodists, where he had played football after returning from World War II. In his first season, he played six matches, including the Grand Final which Essendon narrowly lost to Carlton. His Grand Final bad luck continued, missing Essendon's 1949 and 1950 Grand Final triumphs through injury and playing in another losing Grand Final in 1951.

=== Rutherglen ===
In 1952 Tate joined Rutherglen in the Ovens & Murray Football League as a captain-coach. Tate won the club's best and fairest award in 1952. While at Rutherglen he coached the team to the premiership in 1954.

=== Chiltern ===
After leaving Rutherglen Tate joined Chiltern in the Ovens & King Football League. In 1957 and 1958 he captain-coached Chiltern to successive premierships.

In 2005 Tate was named as coach in Chiltern's "Team of the O&K Years".

== Cricket career ==
Tate played 13 1st XI cricket matches for Essendon Cricket Club in Victorian district cricket between 1942 and 1948.

== Links ==
- 1954 - O&MFL Premiers: Rutherglen FC team photo
