= Bob Hay (footballer, born 1938) =

Australian rules footballer

Personal information
- Full name: Robert Kent Hay
- Born: 13 June 1938; Burnie, Tasmania
- Original team: Longford
- Height: 188 cm (6 ft 2 in)
- Weight: 83 kg (183 lb)
- Position: Ruck / Half Forward

Playing career^{1}
| Years | Club | Games (Goals) |
| 1960–61 | St Kilda | 17 (4) |
- ^{1} Playing statistics correct to the end of 1961.

Bob Hay (born 13 June 1938) is a former Australian rules footballer who played with St Kilda in the Victorian Football League (VFL).

== Early life ==
Bob Hay was born in Burnie in 1938 to Mr and Mrs Ronald Hay. He grew up in Deloraine and attended the local Area School. As a teenager, he was fortunate that his involvement in a motorcycle accident left him only shaken and not badly injured.

== Football career ==
Hay played with Longford in the NTFA during the mid to late 1950s and was coached by Fred Davies.

He then joined St Kilda in 1960.

Hay was captain-coach of Rutherglen in the Ovens & Murray Football League from 1962 to 1965.

When he returned to Tasmania, Hay played with Launceston in the NTFA during the late 1960s and early 1970s.
