= Wilfred Stott =

Australian rules footballer

Personal information
- Full name: Wilfred Stott
- Born: 18 March 1889; Rochdale, England
- Died: 10 December 1973 (aged 84); Geelong, Victoria
- Original teams: Kerang, Richmond (VFA)
- Height: 178 cm (5 ft 10 in)
- Weight: 79 kg (174 lb)

Playing career^{1}
Years	Club	Games (Goals)
1913	Essendon	2 (1)
1919–20	Richmond	9 (0)
Total		11 (1)
- ^{1} Playing statistics correct to the end of 1920.

Wilfred Stott (18 March 1889 – 10 December 1973) was an Australian rules footballer who played with Essendon and Richmond in the Victorian Football League (VFL).

Stott coached the Rutherglen Football Club in the Ovens and Murray Football League in 1925.
