= George Sutherland Smith =

Australian winemaker

George Sutherland Smith (1830 – 18 August 1903) was a Scotsman who migrated to Australia, working as a builder and paddle-steamer captain. He turned to winemaking with considerable success, founding the All Saints winery in the Rutherglen region of Victoria.

== History ==
Smith was born in Caithness, Scotland in 1830 (some sources have 1828), and together with John Banks (1833–1876) trained as a construction engineer, apprenticed as a joiner to Banks's father. They emigrated to Australia at the time of the gold rush, arriving in Victoria in 1852. They were partners in a gold claim in Beechworth, Victoria.

=== Builder and contractor ===
They formed a partnership "Smith & Banks", builders and contractors of Wangaratta and Beechworth in 1857. They engaged in a number of public contracts including the bridge over the Edward River at Deniliquin, extensions to Beechworth prison, and built the hospital and Presbyterian church in Beechworth.

In 1872 they purchased a sawmill at Barnawatha to supply sleepers for the rapidly advancing railway. The sawmill was destroyed by fire in 1875.

=== Riverboats ===
Smith was a partner in Smith & Harris (1863–1866) then Smith & Banks (1865), acting as a local agent for Murray & Jackson, two Americans who ran, and part-owned, the stern-wheel paddle-steamers Settler, Lady Daly and Lady Darling. Smith & Banks built their own steamer, the Teviot at Wahgunyah in 1865, and around the same time took over the Lady Darling. They then purchased the Beechworth; she was destroyed by fire at the Echuca wharf in January 1867; they rebuilt her as the Jane Eliza. Smith & Banks's store in Wahgunyah was swept away in the floods of October 1867. They sold Teviot in 1868 and built new sheds and wharves, then, with the admission of John Foord and his Waradgery, founded the Upper Murray Navigation Line to run between Albury and Echuca. Smith was owner of Lady Darling when it was destroyed by fire in 1871. They skippered Jane Eliza themselves until around 1872, when they chartered her to George Dorward. In 1875 they sold her to Heseltine & Reid and left the business. They had timed it well: within ten years river traffic had passed its peak; there were more boats on the Murray than ever, while newly constructed roads and railways were eating into their traffic, subsidised by States that were jealous of each other's share of the trade.

=== Winemaking ===
The partners had vines under irrigation on the banks of the Murray at Wahgunya in 1864, but met with little success. In 1866 they purchased land at nearby Rutherglen, and developed it into All Saints Vineyard, named for a parish in Caithness. Banks's involvement dropped away in the 1870s, and he died young, in 1876. Smith's wines were successful almost immediately, winning many local and international awards between 1873 and 1883. By 1888 the estate covered 100 acres (40 ha) and boasted a grand castellated cellar building, said to be modelled on the Castle of Mey near Caithness. He was a member of the Rutherglen Vine Growers' Association and its first President, and also served as president of the Rutherglen Shire Council. His sons took over operations and expanded it considerably. At the time of his death All Saints was one of the largest wineries in Victoria, covering 500 acres.

He died of heart failure at his residence "Kia Ora", St Kilda Road, Melbourne on 18 August 1903. His estate was valued at £31,400.

His grandsons and great-grandsons continued operation of the winery, which after some variable fortunes passed in the 1980s into the hands of a syndicate led by Mike Fallon; after his death it was acquired by Brown Brothers in 1992, and is now owned by the children of Peter R. Brown.

== Family ==
Smith married John Banks's sister Elizabeth Banks (c. 1835 – 27 August 1871) in Scotland around 1860. Their children included:

- Joseph Smith (c. 1863 – c. 24 April 1913)
- David Banks Smith (c. 1864 – 4 September 1937)
- George John Banks Smith (c. 1870 – 16 December 1932)

He married again, to Sarah Maria Parsons Runting at Wahgunyah, Victoria on 9 July 1873

- James William Runting Smith (1873 – 24 August 1924).
- Jennie Eliza (1866–1927) married Arthur Boyer Brown, of the Commercial Bank, on 21 April 1892, lived at "Wyvenhoe", Middle Brighton, Victoria. A son, also named Arthur Boyer Brown (born c. 1896), fought in World War I and was awarded the MM.

== See also ==
- Murray-Darling steamboats
- Murray-Darling steamboat people
