= Tom Hallahan =

Australian rules footballer, born 1908

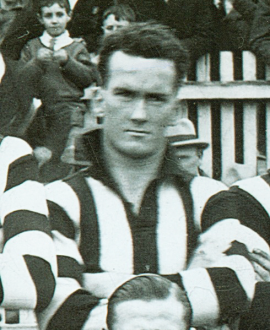
- Hallahan in 1932

Personal information
- Full name: Thomas Joseph Hallahan
- Born: 16 December 1908
- Died: 25 March 1997 (aged 88)
- Original team: Rutherglen
- Height: 182 cm (6 ft 0 in)
- Weight: 74 kg (163 lb)

Playing career^{1}
Years	Club	Games (Goals)
1932	Collingwood	9 (9)
1933–1934	St Kilda	14 (3)
Total		23 (12)
- ^{1} Playing statistics correct to the end of 1934.

Thomas Joseph Hallahan (16 December 1908 – 25 March 1997) was an Australian rules footballer with the Collingwood Football Club and St Kilda Football Club in the Victorian Football League.

Hallahan commenced his footballing career with Collingwood Football Club in 1932. He played 9 games for Collingwood. For St Kilda he played a further 14 games in 1933 and 1934.

Hallahan's father, Jim Hallahan, Sr., also played with St Kilda in 1904.

Hallahan's brother, Jim Hallahan, Jr., played with Fitzroy and Footscray.
