= Clarrie Hearn =

Australian rules footballer (1905–1981)

Personal information
- Full name: Clarence Hugh Hearn
- Born: 13 November 1905; Tocumwal, New South Wales
- Died: 1 April 1981 (aged 75); Moonee Ponds, Victoria
- Original team: Rutherglen
- Height: 183 cm (6 ft 0 in)
- Weight: 80 kg (176 lb)

Playing career^{1}
Years	Club	Games (Goals)
1929–35	Essendon	92 (90)
1936	Sandringham (VFA)	9 (13)
- ^{1} Playing statistics correct to the end of 1936.

Clarence Hugh Hearn (13 November 1905 – 1 April 1981) was an Australian rules footballer who played with Essendon in the Victorian Football League (VFL).

== Family ==
The son of John Hearn (1866–1920), and Joan Hearn (1866—), née Brown, Clarence Hugh Hearn was born at Tocumwal, New South Wales, on 13 November 1905.

He married Moira Lillian Morrison (1912–1991) in 1936.

== Football ==
=== Essendon (VFL) ===
He was recruited from Rutherglen in 1929, and played his first senior match against Richmond, at Windy Hill, on 11 May 1929:

"The [Essendon] committee were very pleased to receive the permit of Hearn from Rutherglen. Hearn, who won this year's Stawell Gift, comes to Essendon with a fine reputation. His form on the track confirms all the glowing tributes that have been paid to his ability, and his marking against some of the aerialists of the side has left nothing to be desired. Hearn is equally at home at half-back, centre or half-forward, and has been included in to-morrow's side on the half-forward wing." — The Age, 10 May 1929.

Hearn spent his early career at Essendon as a defender, mostly at half-back. Despite having managed just two goals from his 31 appearances coming into the 1931 VFL season, Hearn was given a role up forward and kicked 31 goals for the year, 24 of them over five consecutive games. He was used both as a forward and a back for the rest of his time at the club. He kicked seven goals as a full-forward twice: against Fitzroy in 1932 and Hawthorn in 1935.

=== VFL Tribunal ===
Footscray's Alby Morrison and Essendon's Hearn were both reported after the 5 May 1934 match between Essendon and Footscray, at Windy Hill for "unseemly conduct": Morrison was charged with striking Hearn, and Hearn was charged with striking Morrison in retaliation.

At its hearing on 10 May 1934, with Hearn having pleaded guilty to striking in retaliation, the Tribunal declared both players guilty: and having determined that Morrison was "the aggressor", disqualified Morrison for six weeks, and Hearn for four.

=== Victoria (VFL) ===
Hearn was selected to play for the VFL in a representative match against the Victorian Football Association on 16 June 1934; however, he did not play, having injured his hand at training on the Tuesday preceding the match.

=== Sandringham (VFA) ===
Hearn played for Sandringham in the VFA as captain-coach in 1936.

== Athlete ==
Known for his pace as a footballer, Hearn was a competitive professional sprinter. Trained by Jack King, he won the Stawell Gift in 1929, running off a handicap of 10½ yards.

== Boundary umpire ==
He was a boundary umpire for 12 VFL games in 1937.

== Death ==
He died at his residence in Moonee Ponds, Victoria on 1 April 1981.
