= George Robbins (footballer) =

Australian rules footballer

Personal information
- Full name: George Mead Robbins
- Born: 12 September 1903; Boort, Victoria
- Died: 5 October 1998 (aged 95)
- Original team: Rutherglen
- Height: 173 cm (5 ft 8 in)
- Weight: 70 kg (154 lb)

Playing career^{1}
Years	Club	Games (Goals)
1921–1922, 1924	St Kilda	7 (6)
1925, 1929	Carlton	4 (0)
1929–1930	Footscray	13 (0)
Total		24 (6)
- ^{1} Playing statistics correct to the end of 1930.

George Mead Robbins (12 September 1903 – 5 October 1998) was an Australian rules footballer who played with St Kilda, Carlton and Footscray in the Victorian Football League (VFL).

Robbins was coach of Wangaratta's 1945 Murray Valley Patriotic Football League premiership team.

Robbins was coach of Rutherglen in 1947 and 1948.
