= Stan Hiskins =

Australian rules footballer

Personal information
- Full name: Stanley Clarence Hiskins
- Born: 2 June 1890; Wahgunyah, Victoria
- Died: 2 April 1974 (aged 83); Caulfield, Victoria
- Original teams: Lake Rovers, Rutherglen
- Height: 178 cm (5 ft 10 in)
- Weight: 74 kg (163 lb)
- Position: Half-back flank

Playing career^{1}
Years	Club	Games (Goals)
1913–14, 1919–21	South Melbourne	66 (34)
- ^{1} Playing statistics correct to the end of 1921.

Stanley Clarence Hiskins (2 June 1890 – 2 April 1974) was an Australian rules footballer who played with South Melbourne in the Victorian Football League (VFL).

Hiskins was one of four brothers from Rutherglen who appeared in the VFL. He played beside Arthur Hiskins at South Melbourne while his others brothers, Fred and Rupe, played for Essendon and Carlton, respectively.

Hiskins made his VFL debut in round one, 1913 alongside his Lake Rover teammate, Dick Fitzgerald.

A carpenter by trade, Hiskins kicked 19 goals in his debut season in 1913. He was one of South Melbourne's half back flankers in their 1914 Grand Final loss to Carlton.

He lost the next four years of his career to the war, during which time he served overseas with the 1st Motor Transport Company.

Hiskins returned from the war late in 1918 and the following year, returned to South Melbourne to play another three seasons.
