= Ray Horwood =

Australian rules footballer

Personal information
- Full name: Ray Horwood
- Born: 1 December 1927
- Died: 15 October 2009 (aged 81)
- Original team: Collingwood Technical School
- Height: 157 cm (5 ft 2 in)
- Weight: 60.5 kg (133 lb)

Playing career^{1}
Years	Club	Games (Goals)
1946–49, 1953–1954	Collingwood	55 (13)
1950–52	Richmond	27 (26)
Total		82 (39)
- ^{1} Playing statistics correct to the end of 1952.

Ray Horwood (1 December 1927 – 15 October 2009) was an Australian rules footballer who played with Collingwood and Richmond in the Victorian Football League (VFL).

In early 1953, Horwood trained with the Richmond Football Club. He later went back to Collingwood in 1953 and managed to play two senior games in 1954.

Horwood purchased a sport store in Sanger St, Corowa and played with Corowa Football Club in 1955 in the Ovens and Murray Football League.

Horwood was captain-coach of Rutherglen in 1967.

Horwood was the non-playing coach of Rutherglen in 1966.
