= Jimmy Roberts (Australian footballer) =

Australian rules footballer

Personal information
- Full name: James Roberts
- Born: 16 April 1883; Bendigo, Victoria
- Died: 16 September 1961 (aged 78); Fitzroy, Victoria
- Original team: Rutherglen / Bendigo

Playing career^{1}
Years	Club	Games (Goals)
1904	Geelong	1 (0)
- ^{1} Playing statistics correct to the end of 1904.

Jimmy Roberts (16 April 1883 – 16 September 1961) was an Australian rules footballer who played with Geelong in the Victorian Football League (VFL).
