= Ron Bywater =

Australian rules footballer

Personal information
- Full name: Ronald Charles Eric Bywater
- Born: 8 January 1919; Moonee Ponds
- Died: 18 May 1975 (aged 56)
- Height: 183 cm (6 ft 0 in)
- Weight: 83 kg (183 lb)

Playing career^{1}
Years	Club	Games (Goals)
1942–1950	South Melbourne	58 (39)
- ^{1} Playing statistics correct to the end of 1950.

Ronald Charles Eric Bywater (8 January 1919 – 18 May 1975) was an Australian rules footballer who played with South Melbourne in the Victorian Football League (VFL).

A key position player, Bywater missed many games early in his career due to his war service. He made just two appearances from 1942 to 1945. During the 1946 season, in July, Bywater announced his retirement, due to heart problems. He however returned the following year and in what was his first full season came within five votes of winning the 1947 Brownlow Medal, finishing equal third and was runner up to Bill Williams in the 1947 club best and fairest award.

As a result of a broken ankle, Bywater was out of action for much of the 1948 season. He was used up forward in 1949 and kicked 25 goals from his 16 appearances. Only Dick Jones kicked more goals for South Melbourne that year.

Bywater left South Melbourne midway through the 1950 season and joined Corowa. He was reunited with former teammate Billy King, the then captain-coach.

Bywater transferred to the Rutherglen Football Club in 1951.

== Links ==
- 1947 - South Melbourne FC team photo
- 1954 - O&MFL Premiers: Rutherglen FC team photo
