= All Saints Estate Winery =

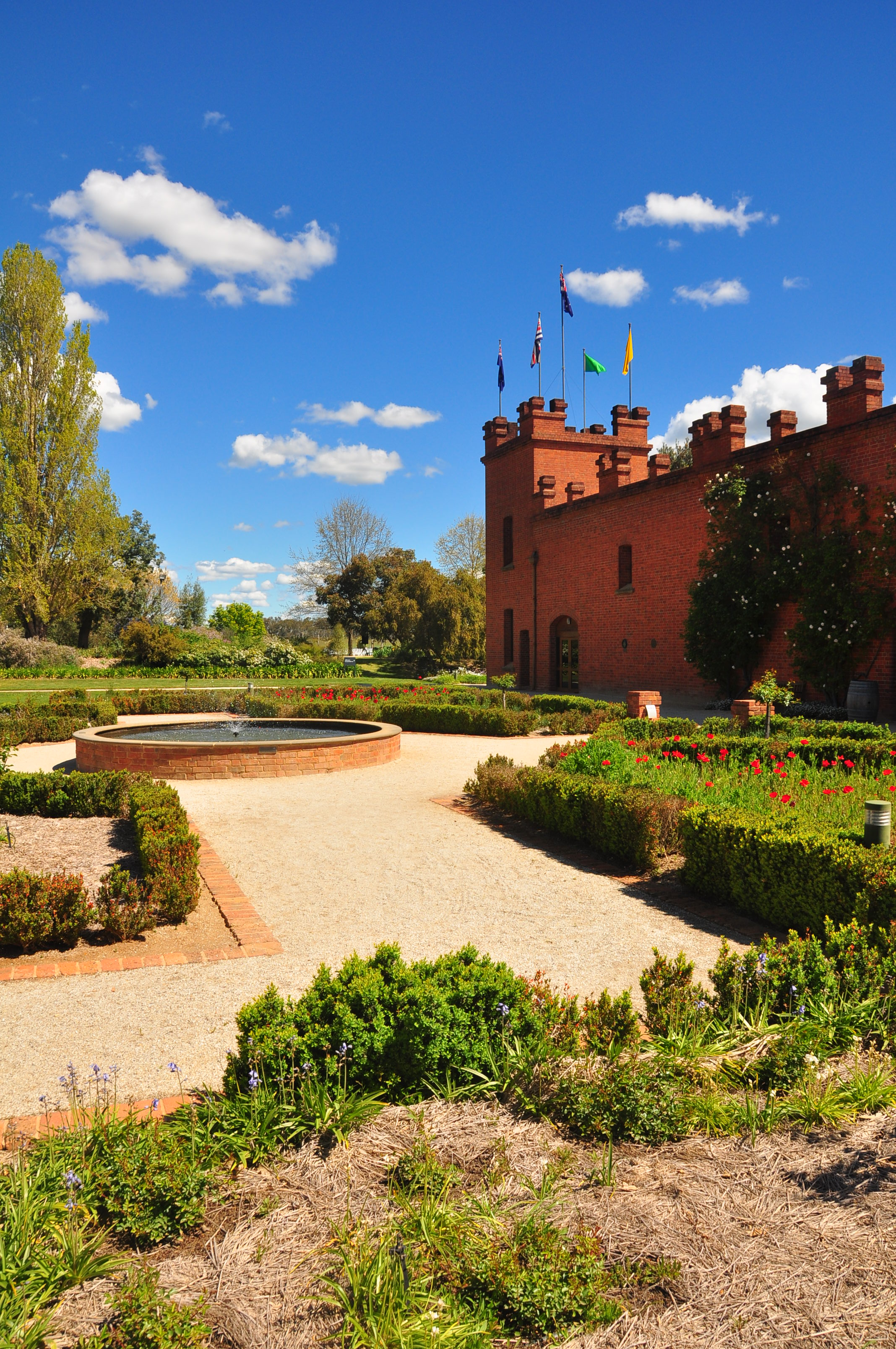
- The All Saints Winery cellar door in 2009.
- Interactive map of the All Saints Estate Winery area

General information
- Coordinates: 36°00′09″S 146°24′44″E
- Completed: 1864

Design and construction
- Main contractor: George Sutherland Smith and John Banks

Website
- www.allsaintswine.com.au

Register of the National Estate

Victorian Heritage Register
- Official name: All Saints Winery
- Reference no.: VHR H0333

All Saints Estate Winery is a family owned wine company based in Wahgunyah, Victoria, Australia. All Saints was built in 1864 by Scotsmen George Sutherland Smith and John Banks. The castle building was based on one of the Queen's castles - The Castle of Mey. There are a number of historical buildings still standing today, including the Chinese dormitory and the original bottling hall. The cellars, vats, dormitory and hall together with the castellated brick walls with a square corner tower are listed on the (now defunct) Register of the National Estate and the Victorian Heritage Register.

The estate is owned and run today by siblings Eliza, Angela, and Nicholas Brown. All Saints makes wine from a wide variety of grapes.
