= Aaron Henneman =

Australian rules footballer, born 1980

Personal information
- Full name: Aaron Henneman
- Born: 13 December 1980 (age 45)
- Original teams: Corowa-Rutherglen, Murray Bushrangers
- Height: 195 cm (6 ft 5 in)
- Weight: 100 kg (220 lb)
- Positions: Key defender, ruckman

Playing career^{1}
Years	Club	Games (Goals)
2000–2006	Essendon	58 (5)
- ^{1} Playing statistics correct to the end of 2005.

Aaron Henneman (born 13 December 1980) is a former Australian rules footballer who played with Essendon in the Australian Football League (AFL). Henneman joined YVMDFL club Silvan in 2007 after being delisted by Essendon the year before. He joined ex-Essendon teammates at Silvan, including Gary Moorcroft, Ben Haynes and Marc Bullen. Henneman played a starring role at centre half-back in the Silvan premiership the same year. He had most recently been playing a starring forward role in recent times for the Oakleigh Football Club despite a tough time with recent shoulder injuries.

== Recruitment ==
Henneman won the 1997 Ovens & Murray Football League Under 18 best and fairest award, the Leo Dean Medal, before joining the Murray Bushrangers. His career with the Essendon Football Club began when he was drafted from Corowa-Rutherglen, (the same team as Adam, Josh, Damian and Ryan Houlihan) in the 1998 AFL draft at pick 25. He made his debut in 2000, and, with his 194 cm, 99 kg frame, he had been touted as a promising key defender and ruckman.

== Essendon career ==
Henneman played 58 games with the Essendon Football Club. He was injury-stricken at Essendon, which meant he did not get as many games as he wanted. As well as this, Henneman only got into tribunal trouble just once, when he was banned for two matches for striking Sydney's Adam Schneider during a match in 2005.

He was delisted at the end of 2006.
