= Bobby Ewer =

Australian rules footballer, born 1904

Personal information
- Full name: Robert James Ewer
- Born: 2 July 1904; Yarrawonga, Victoria
- Died: 11 March 1995 (aged 90); Wangaratta, Victoria
- Original team: Rutherglen
- Height: 182 cm (6 ft 0 in)
- Weight: 90 kg (198 lb)

Playing career^{1}
Years	Club	Games (Goals)
1924–25	Melbourne	7 (1)
- ^{1} Playing statistics correct to the end of 1925.

Robert James Ewer (2 July 1904 – 11 March 1995) was an Australian rules footballer who played with Melbourne in the Victorian Football League (VFL).

Recruited as a ruckman in 1924, Ewer played six games in his rookie season.

He was called up as a replacement early in 1925 to play in defence when captain Albert Chadwick came down with the flu. He was dropped immediately afterwards, and was cleared back to Rutherglen in early 1926 after failing to play in a win across his seven-game career.
