= Rutherglen Sun and Chiltern Valley Advertiser =

Former newspaper of Victoria, Australia

The Rutherglen Sun and Chiltern Valley Advertiser, also published as the Rutherglen Sun, The Rutherglen Sun and Murray Valley Advertiser, Rutherglen and Wahgunyah News, Sun and Chiltern Valley Advertiser as well as the Corowa-Rutherglen Sun, was a weekly English language newspaper published in Rutherglen, Victoria, Australia.

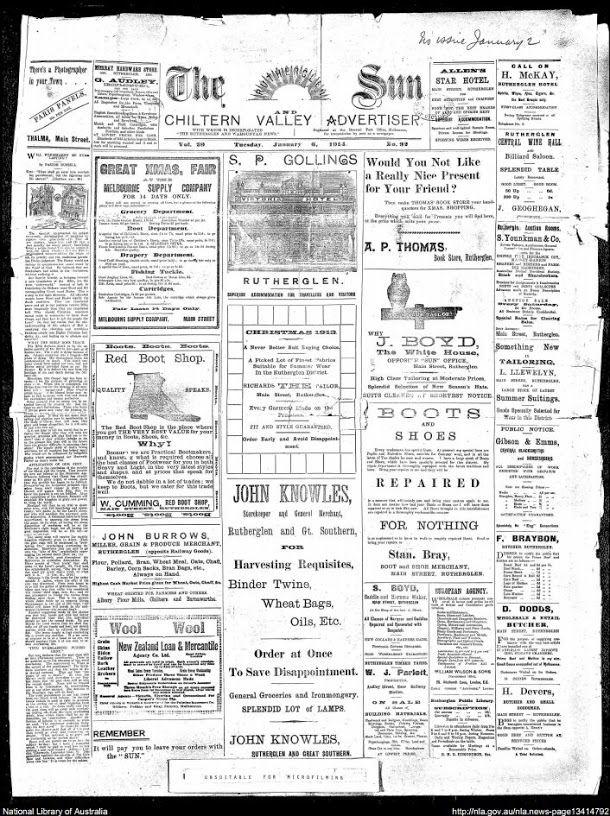
Front page of Rutherglen Sun, 6 January 1914

== History ==
The Rutherglen Sun and Chiltern Valley Advertiser newspaper was printed in Rutherglen, Victoria from 1886 until 1979. The editor of the newspaper was T. Drenen. The newspaper had the following name changes: Rutherglen Sun, The Rutherglen Sun and Murray Valley Advertiser, Rutherglen and Wahgunyah News, Sun and Chiltern Valley Advertiser and Corowa-Rutherglen Sun. The newspaper closed in 1980.

== Digitisation ==
The paper has been digitised as part of the Australian Newspapers Digitisation Program of the National Library of Australia.

== See also ==
- List of newspapers in Australia
