= Colin Crampton =

Australian rules footballer (1933–1995)

Personal information
- Full name: Colin George Crampton
- Born: 19 April 1933
- Died: 6 July 1995 (aged 62)
- Original team: Rutherglen
- Height: 194 cm (6 ft 4 in)
- Weight: 85 kg (187 lb)

Playing career^{1}
Years	Club	Games (Goals)
1956–57	North Melbourne	6 (1)
- ^{1} Playing statistics correct to the end of 1957.

Colin George Crampton (19 April 1933 – 6 July 1995) was an Australian rules footballer who played with North Melbourne in the Victorian Football League (VFL).

Crampton played with Moyhu Football Club in the Ovens & King Football League from 1966 to 1968 and was their captain / coach in 1968.

Crampton died on 6 July 1995, at the age of 62.
