= Ken Baker (footballer) =

Australian rules footballer

Personal information
- Born: 9 September 1944
- Original team: Rutherglen
- Height: 188 cm (6 ft 2 in)
- Weight: 87 kg (192 lb)
- Position: Defence

Playing career^{1}
Years	Club	Games (Goals)
1965–66	St Kilda	9 (0)
- ^{1} Playing statistics correct to the end of 1966.

Ken Baker (born 9 September 1944) is a former Australian rules footballer who played with St Kilda in the Victorian Football League (VFL).
