= Michael Hawking =

Australian rules footballer

Personal information
- Full name: Michael Hawking
- Born: 1 June 1952 (age 74)
- Original team: Rutherglen (O&MFL)
- Height: 191 cm (6 ft 3 in)
- Weight: 80 kg (176 lb)

Playing career^{1}
Years	Club	Games (Goals)
1972	North Melbourne	3 (5)
- ^{1} Playing statistics correct to the end of 1972.

Michael Hawking (born 1 June 1952) is a former Australian rules footballer who played with North Melbourne in the Victorian Football League (VFL).

Originally from Ovens and Murray Football League (O&MFL) club Rutherglen, Hawking played three games for North Melbourne before transferring to Penguin Football Club in Tasmania's North West Football Union (NWFU) as a fly-in, fly-out player. He joined Victorian Football Association (VFA) club Caulfield in 1975, playing 87 matches for them until his retirement in 1980.

== Sources ==
- Piesse, K. (2010) The Bears Uncensored, Cricketbooks.com.au: Melbourne. ISBN 9780646528793
