= Rupe Hiskins =

Australian rules footballer

Personal information
- Full name: Rupert Ernest Hiskins
- Born: 29 October 1893; Rutherglen, Victoria
- Died: 9 March 1976 (aged 82); Heidelberg Repatriation Hospital
- Original team: Rutherglen Football Club
- Height: 185 cm (6 ft 1 in)
- Weight: 88 kg (194 lb)

Playing career^{1}
Years	Club	Games (Goals)
1920–1924	Carlton	74 (9)
- ^{1} Playing statistics correct to the end of 1924.

Rupert Ernest "Rupe" Hiskins (29 October 1893 – 9 March 1976) was an Australian rules footballer who played with Carlton in the Victorian Football League (VFL).

Hiskins, one of 14 siblings, had three elder brothers that played in the VFL, Arthur, Fred and Stan.

He served with the Light Horse Brigade during the First World War.

Already 26 by the time he debuted in 1920, Hiskins played five seasons at Carlton, usually in the ruck, resting on the half back flank and wing. He played in the 1921 VFL Grand Final, which Carlton lost by four points.

Hiskins was a member of Brunswick's 1925 VFA premiership team.
