= Kevin Gleeson =

Australian rules footballer (1930–2010)

Personal information
- Full name: Kevin Gleeson
- Born: 18 September 1930
- Died: 18 September 2010 (aged 80)
- Original teams: Benalla, Rutherglen
- Height: 183 cm (6 ft 0 in)
- Weight: 83 kg (183 lb)

Playing career^{1}
Years	Club	Games (Goals)
1953	Richmond	1 (0)
- ^{1} Playing statistics correct to the end of 1953.

Kevin Gleeson (18 September 1930 – 18 September 2010) was a former Australian rules footballer who played with Richmond in the Victorian Football League (VFL).

Gleeson kicked 27 goals from seven games in 1950 and 61 goals in 1951 for Benalla, then Gleeson kicked 106 goals for Rutherglen Football Club in the Ovens and Murray Football League in 1952.

Gleeson won Richmond's Reserves goal kicking award in 1953 with 40 goals.

Gleeson returned to Rutherglen and played in their 1954 O&MFL premiership and kicked 63 goals for the season.

Gleeson was captain-coach of Ganmain Football Club in the South West Football League (New South Wales) in 1958, in which they finished 4th, losing their first semi final to Narrandera.
