= Jim King (footballer) =

Australian rules footballer

Personal information
- Full name: James Bernard King
- Born: 23 November 1873; Bacchus Marsh, Victoria
- Died: 9 January 1929 (aged 55); Holbrook, New South Wales
- Original team: Rutherglen

Playing career^{1}
Years	Club	Games (Goals)
1902–03	South Melbourne	15 (0)
1904–05	St Kilda	13 (2)
Total		28 (2)
- ^{1} Playing statistics correct to the end of 1905.

Jim King (23 November 1873 – 9 January 1929) was an Australian rules footballer who played with South Melbourne and St Kilda in the Victorian Football League (VFL).

King was the brother of former St. Kilda Football Club player, Jack King and Stawell Gift winning trainer and 1908 Stawell Gift winner, Chris King.

King died in tragic circumstances when a tree fell on him after cleaning up after a bush fire on his land in Holbrook and crushed his skull.
