= Jeff Bruce =

Australian rules footballer

Personal information
- Full name: Jeff Bruce
- Born: 9 November 1973 (age 52)
- Original teams: Rennie, Corowa-Rutherglen, (OMFL)

Playing career^{1}
Years	Club	Games (Goals)
1995	Fitzroy	7 (3)
- ^{1} Playing statistics correct to the end of 1995.

Jeff Bruce (born 9 November 1973) is a former Australian rules footballer who played for Fitzroy in the Australian Football League (AFL) in 1995. He was recruited from the Corowa-Rutherglen Football Club in the Ovens & Murray Football League (OMFL) with the 58th selection in the 1993 AFL draft.

He later moved to Western Australia where he played for West Perth Football Club in the West Australian Football League (WAFL), leading the club's goal kicking in 1999.
