= Hugh Earnshaw =

Australian rules footballer

Personal information
- Full name: Hugh Francis Earnshaw
- Born: 16 February 1939
- Died: 31 December 1982 (aged 43)
- Original teams: Shepparton, Rutherglen
- Height: 173 cm (5 ft 8 in)
- Weight: 76 kg (168 lb)

Playing career^{1}
| Years | Club | Games (Goals) |
| 1959 | Geelong | 2 (0) |
- ^{1} Playing statistics correct to the end of 1959.

Hugh Francis Earnshaw (16 February 1939 – 31 December 1982) was an Australian rules footballer who played with Geelong in the Victorian Football League (VFL).

Earnshaw played with a number of rural clubs, during his time working as a bank clerk, which included Shepparton, Rutherglen, Yackandandah and Wangaratta Rovers.

In 1964, Earnshaw, at that time was playing with Yackandandah Football Club, tied on votes with the Tallangatta & District Football League best and fairest award winner, but finished as runner up on the old countback system, but has never received a retrospective medal from the T&DFNL.

Earnshaw played six senior matches with the Wangaratta Rovers in the Ovens & Murray Football League in 1968.
