= Reg Edwards (Australian footballer) =

Australian rules footballer

Personal information
- Full name: Reg Edwards
- Born: 28 June 1943 (age 83)
- Original team: Rutherglen
- Height: 197 cm (6 ft 6 in)
- Weight: 88 kg (194 lb)

Playing career^{1}
Years	Club	Games (Goals)
1964	South Melbourne	1 (1)
- ^{1} Playing statistics correct to the end of 1964.

Reg Edwards (born 28 June 1943) is a former Australian rules footballer who played with South Melbourne in the Victorian Football League (VFL).

After one game with South Melbourne against Collingwood, Edwards returned to Rutherglen, in the Ovens & Murray Football League and kicked 338 goals between 1961 and 1969 and from 1973 to 1975 and played 189 senior O&MFL games.

Edwards was captain-coach of Howlong Football Club in the Hume Football League from 1970 to 1972, leading them to a premiership in 1971.
