= Harry Kerley =

Australian rules footballer (1894–1987)

Personal information
- Full name: Henry Charles Kerley
- Born: 12 December 1894; Prahran, Victoria
- Died: 23 January 1987 (aged 92); Numurkah, Victoria
- Original team: Prahran Juniors
- Height: 178 cm (5 ft 10 in)
- Weight: 73 kg (161 lb)
- Position: Centre Half-Forward

Playing career^{1}
Years	Club	Games (Goals)
1915	Collingwood (VFL)	12 (21)
1921–1922	St Kilda (VFL)	20 (29)
1923	Prahran (VFA)	5 (10)
1923–1924	Port Melbourne (VFA)	15 (29)
1925–1929	Coburg (VFA)	83 (128)
- ^{1} Playing statistics correct to the end of 1929.

Career highlights
- AIF Pioneer Exhibition Game, London, 28 October 1916; Prahran (VFA): Captain-Coach: 1923; Port Melbourne (VFA): Grand Final team: 1923; Coburg (VFA): Captain: 1926-1927; Captain-Coach: 1928; VFA Premiership player: 1926, 1927, 1928; Team of the Century member

Henry Charles "Harry" Kerley (12 December 1894 – 23 January 1987) was an Australian rules footballer who played for Collingwood and St Kilda in the Victorian Football League (VFL).

== Family ==
The fourth son of John Kerley (1855-1939), and Sarah Ann Kerley (née Hillier, 1860-1941), Henry Charles Kerley was born on 12 December 1894.

He married Rose Gertrude Robinson (1900-1987) in 1922. They had two children: Rosie Eleanor Kerley (1923-2010), later Mrs Henry Ellis Sevior, and Betty Pauline Kerley (1925-2005), later Mrs Alfred James Wright.

== Football ==
=== Collingwood (VFL) ===
Having been cleared from Prahran Juniors to Collingwood Districts in July 1914. he played his first VFL match for Collingwood, selected in the forward pocket, against Carlton, at Princes Park, on 7 June 1915, replacing Gus Dobrigh, who had been dropped for failing to attend training. Kerley twice kicked four goals in his games with Collingwood in 1915 among his year's total of 21.

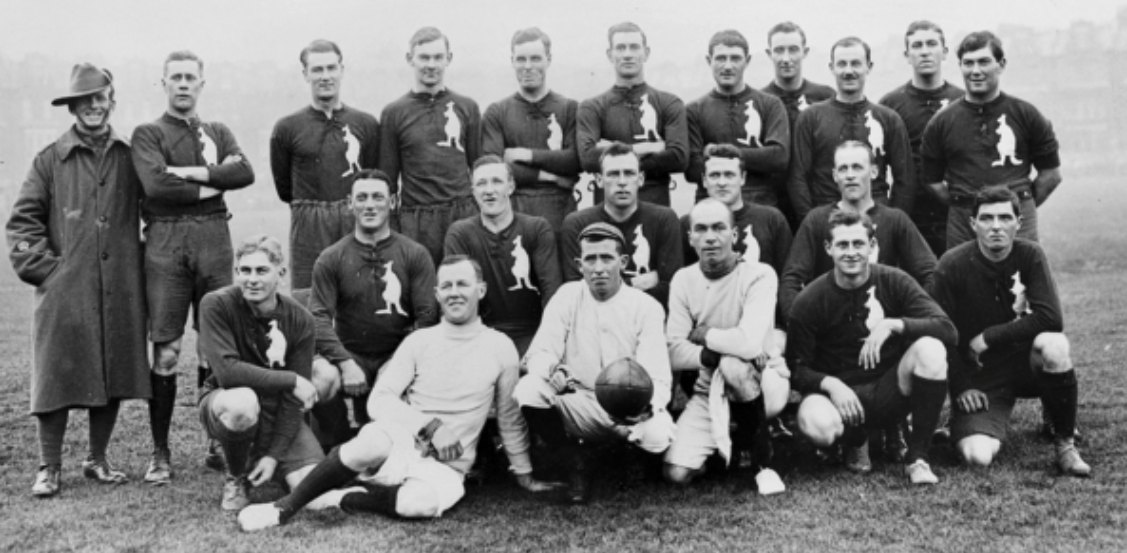
The Australian Training Units Team: 28 October 1916. Harry Kerley is second from the right in the back row.

=== Training Units team (AIF) ===
He represented the Australian Training Units team in the famous "Pioneer Exhibition Game" of Australian Rules football, held in London, in October 1916. A news film was taken at the match.

=== St Kilda (VFL) ===
In 1921, Kerley was cleared from Collingwood to play with St Kilda. He played his first match for St Kilda, against South Melbourne, on 7 May 1921 (round one). He played his last match for St Kilda, again against South Melbourne, on 5 August 1922 (round thirteen). In all he played 20 senior games for St Kilda (15 games in 1921, and 5 games in 1922).

=== Prahran (VFA) ===
On the basis that Kerley had been appointed to the position of captain-coach at Prahran Football Club, St Kilda granted him a clearance. He played well for Prahran in the first five games of the 1923 season; and then, for reasons that have never been fully revealed, Kerley and Prahran severed all connection with each other, and Thomas J. Bayliss assumed the coaching duties.

=== Port Melbourne (VFA) ===
Granted a clearance from Prahran on 20 June 1923, he transferred to Port Melbourne part-way through the 1923 season, and played his first game for Port Melbourne, against Geelong Association, in round eight. He played in every match in the 1923 season, including the losing Grand Final against Footscray; and played twice in the 1924 season. He was captain of the Port Melbourne team on at least one occasion. Kerley coached the Rutherglen in the Ovens & Murray Football League in 1924.

=== Coburg (VFA) ===
Kerley transferred to the Coburg at the beginning of the 1925 season. It was the club's first VFA season, having been admitted to the VFA competition (among other things, to keep an even number of teams and remove the problem of byes) following the move of Footscray, North Melbourne and Hawthorn to the VFL.

Kerley was the team's captain in three successive premierships (1926, 1927, and 1928), and all in all he played 83 games for Coburg, mainly at centre half-forward, kicking 128 goals.

He was appointed captain-coach for both the 1928 and 1929 seasons, but resigned the position on 16 July 1929, because "he considered that it interfered with his play". "He said that he was not satisfied with the form the team had shown, and that, together with the fact that he had injured his hand at Brunswick (on 22 June}, had caused him to decide that it would be in the best interests of all concerned for him to drop out.

His resignation was accepted. Fred Chapman and Jim Jenkins were asked to supervise the team's training for the remainder of the 1929 season). Coburg, the 1926, 1927, and 1928 premiers, finished outside the final four in 1929 (in sixth position, with 14 wins from 22 matches). Although he was listed again by Coburg for the 1930 season, he retired and never played senior football again.

=== Northcote (VFA) ===
In 1930 he was appointed coach of the Northcote Football Club's Second XVIII.

== Military service ==
Just 21, Kerley enlisted in the First AIF in February 1916, and was discharged from the service in October 1919.

== Death ==
He died at Numurkah, Victoria on 23 January 1987.

== See also ==
- 1916 Pioneer Exhibition Game
