= William Harry =

Australian rules footballer

Personal information
- Full name: William Richard Harry
- Born: 30 November 1877; Eldorado, Victoria
- Died: 21 February 1943 (aged 65); Gooramadda, Victoria
- Original team: Rutherglen
- Position: Back Pocket

Playing career^{1}
Years	Club	Games (Goals)
1906	Carlton	1 (0)
- ^{1} Playing statistics correct to the end of 1906.

William Richard Harry (30 November 1877 – 21 February 1943) was an Australian rules footballer who played in one game for Carlton in 1906.

The oldest of twelve children, Harry was recruited to Carlton by Jack Worrall and made his debut in Round 11, 1906, against Collingwood at Princes Park. After his solitary game for Carlton, he returned to his family in Rutherglen. He continued to play for Rutherglen before retiring to become an umpire.

Harry died in 1943 after drowning in the Murray River attempting to retrieve a duck he had just shot.
