= Mark O'Donoghue =

Australian rules footballer

Personal information
- Full name: Mark O'Donoghue
- Born: 10 July 1967 (age 59)
- Original team: Corowa-Rutherglen
- Height: 177 cm (5 ft 10 in)
- Weight: 71 kg (157 lb)

Playing career^{1}
Years	Club	Games (Goals)
1988	North Melbourne	2 (2)
- ^{1} Playing statistics correct to the end of 1988.

Mark O'Donoghue (born 10 July 1967) is a former Australian rules footballer who played for North Melbourne in the Victorian Football League (VFL).

O'Donoghue spent the 1988 VFL season at North Melbourne and kicked two goals on debut against Geelong, a debut he shared with Mick Martyn. He represented New South Wales at the 1988 Adelaide Bicentennial Carnival. The rest of his career was played in the Ovens & Murray Football League with Corowa-Rutherglen.
