= Clem Goonan =

Australian rules footballer

Personal information
- Born: 18 June 1939 (age 87)
- Original teams: Whorouly, Myrtleford
- Height: 180 cm (5 ft 11 in)
- Weight: 85 kg (187 lb)

Playing career^{1}
Years	Club	Games (Goals)
1961–1964	South Melbourne	50 (2)
- ^{1} Playing statistics correct to the end of 1964.

Clem Goonan (born 18 June 1939) is a former Australian rules footballer who played with South Melbourne in the Victorian Football League (VFL).

Goonan played his early football at Whorouly and won the Ovens & King Football League's best and fairest award in 1958. Although approached by four VFL clubs, Goonan next played for Myrtleford. He was cleared to South Melbourne in 1961, where he remained until 1964, with most of his 50 appearances coming as a defender or ruck-rover.

Relocated to northern Victoria through his work as a police officer, Goonan joined the Albury Football Club. A knee injury cost him a spot in Albury's 1966 premiership team.

He later spent four years as captain-coach of Rutherglen. and one year as Captain Coach of Burrumbuttock in the Hume League in the mid-1970's.

He was inducted into the Ovens & King Football League Hall of Fame in 2006.

Goonan was also a fine athlete and won both the 130 yards Moyhu Gift and the 70 yards event at the 1959 Moyhu Sports Carnival.
