= Ted Farrell =

Australian rules footballer

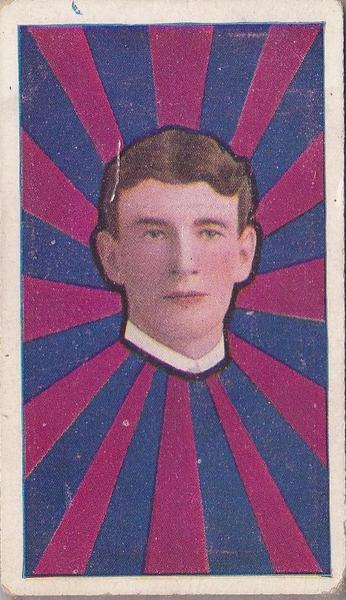
- Cigarette card of Farrell in 1911

Personal information
- Full name: Edward James Farrell
- Born: 19 October 1889; South Melbourne, Victoria
- Died: 5 February 1960 (aged 70); Heidelberg, Victoria
- Original team: Surrey Hills
- Height: 178 cm (5 ft 10 in)
- Weight: 75 kg (165 lb)
- Position: Defence / Centre

Playing career^{1}
Years	Club	Games (Goals)
1910–11	Fitzroy	12 (3)
1911–14	Richmond	41 (2)
Total		53 (5)
- ^{1} Playing statistics correct to the end of 1914.

Edward James Farrell (19 October 1889 – 5 February 1960) was an Australian rules footballer who played with Fitzroy and Richmond in the Victorian Football League (VFL).
