= Jim Hallahan Sr. =

Australian rules footballer

Personal information
- Full name: James Richard Hallahan
- Born: 4 June 1878; Rutherglen, Victoria
- Died: 1 July 1964 (aged 86); Sunshine, Victoria
- Original team: Rutherglen
- Height: 176 cm (5 ft 9 in)
- Weight: 72 kg (159 lb)

Playing career^{1}
Years	Club	Games (Goals)
1904	St Kilda	2 (1)
- ^{1} Playing statistics correct to the end of 1904.

James Richard Hallahan (4 June 1878 – 1 July 1964) was an Australian rules footballer with the St Kilda Football Club in the Victorian Football League.

Hallahan played 2 games for St Kilda in 1904.

Hallahan's son Jim played with Fitzroy in the 1940s and his son Tom also played with St Kilda.

His great-grandson Mitch Hallahan debuted for Hawthorn in 2014.
