= Cathriona Hallahan =

Irish business executive

- Born: 1964/1965
- Education: Dublin Business School (ACCA)
- Known for: Former Managing Director, Microsoft Ireland
- Predecessor: Paul Rellis
- Successor: Anne Sheehan

Cathriona Hallahan is an Irish business executive who was the Managing Director of Microsoft Ireland from 2013 until 2021. Her work has been recognised with several awards.

== Early life ==
Cathriona Hallahan grew up in Stillorgan, County Dublin. Her father was a mechanic and her mother worked for a cleaning company. After leaving school, Hallahan completed a secretarial course.

== Career ==
In 1986, Hallahan joined Microsoft's Ireland office in Sandyford as an accounts clerk, and became employee number 24. With encouragement from her manager, she became a qualified accounting technician and went on to do her accounting exams. Hallahan worked her way up through the cost accounting department to become finance manager, and later took on roles in company operations, including a regional (Europe, Middle East and Africa) leadership position.

In February 2013, Hallahan was appointed as managing director of Microsoft Ireland, one of four operations centres for the technology company outside of the United States, with, as of 2015, over 1,200 employees. In this role, she represents the company on all strategic policy, corporate affairs and communications issues. She is the longest-serving Microsoft Ireland employee. She is due to resign as managing director, to be replaced by Anne Sheehan in October 2021.

Hallahan was a member of the Board of Ibec, Ireland's principal employer representative body for a few years as well.

In December 2020, she decided to step down from her position at Microsoft Ireland after nearly 8 years in the role.

== Public service roles ==
Hallahan is a member of the Advistory Board of the Business School of Trinity College Dublin. She is also president of the Dancesport Federation of Ireland, the governing body for certain dance forms in the State.

== Honours and awards ==
In 2009, Hallahan won the O2 WMB Businesswoman of the Year award. In 2014, she was named CEO Businesswoman of the Year by Image Magazine, an Irish publication, and she was inducted into the Women's Executive Network's Hall of Fame in 2015, having won the Top 25 Award twice. In 2018, Concern Worldwide presented her with its inaugural Women of Concern award, an award set up to recognise leaders who promote gender equality.

== Personal life ==
Hallahan lives in County Wicklow, Ireland, with her husband, Tim and daughter, Molly.
