= Mike Hallahan =

Australian rules footballer

Personal information
- Full name: Michael Hallahan
- Born: 14 March 1949 (age 77)
- Original team: Wangaratta Rovers
- Height: 180 cm (5 ft 11 in)
- Weight: 80 kg (176 lb)

Playing career^{1}
Years	Club	Games (Goals)
1967	Fitzroy	3 (0)
- ^{1} Playing statistics correct to the end of 1967.

Michael Hallahan (born 14 March 1949) is a former Australian rules footballer with the Fitzroy Football Club in the Victorian Football League.

Hallahan commenced his footballing career with Wangaratta Rovers Football Club. For Fitzroy he played 3 games in 1967.

Hallahan's father, Jim Hallahan, Jr., also played with Fitzroy in the 1940s.

Hallahan is married to Judith Hallahan, had two children and two grandchildren.
