= Doug Hill (footballer) =

Australian rules footballer

Personal information
- Full name: Douglas Keith Hill
- Born: 27 January 1884; Brunswick, Victoria
- Died: 28 June 1968 (aged 84)
- Original team: Rutherglen

Playing career^{1}
Years	Club	Games (Goals)
1908	St Kilda	1 (1)
- ^{1} Playing statistics correct to the end of 1908.

Douglas Keith Hill (27 January 1884 – 28 June 1968) was an Australian rules footballer who played with St Kilda in the Victorian Football League (VFL).
