= Bob Hodgkin =

Australian rules footballer

Personal information
- Full name: Robert Hodgkin
- Born: 28 August 1949 (age 77)
- Original teams: Kergunyah, Tallangatta (T&DFL)
- Height: 170 cm (5 ft 7 in)
- Weight: 67 kg (148 lb)
- Position: Defence

Playing career^{1}
Years	Club	Games (Goals)
1969–71	Fitzroy	24 (0)
- ^{1} Playing statistics correct to the end of 1971.

Bob Hodgkin (born 28 August 1949) is a former Australian rules footballer who played with Fitzroy in the Victorian Football League (VFL).

Played with Rutherglen in 1972, then was appointed as captain-coach in 1973.
