= Brad C. Campbell =

Australian rules footballer (born 1975)

Brad Campbell

Personal information
- Full name: Brad C. Campbell
- Born: 21 December 1975 (age 50)
- Original teams: Corowa Rutherglen, Port Melbourne
- Height: 181 cm (5 ft 11 in)
- Weight: 83 kg (183 lb)

Playing career^{1}
Years	Club	Games (Goals)
1997–1999	St Kilda	22 (2)
- ^{1} Playing statistics correct to the end of 1999.

Brad C. Campbell (born 21 December 1975) is a former Australian rules footballer who played with St Kilda in the Australian Football League (AFL).

Originally from Corowa-Rutherglen, Campbell played for Port Melbourne in 1996 and was then picked up by St Kilda with the 15th selection of the Pre-season Draft. He made four appearances in the first half 1997 AFL season and wasn't picked for the remainder of the year, when St Kilda made it all the way to the grand final. A back pocket defender, he played 14 games in 1998, including his side's two point qualifying final loss to the Sydney Swans.

Campbell joined Subiaco in 2000 and spent three seasons with the West Australian Football League club, playing a total of 51 games. He won a Simpson Medal in 2000, for his efforts in an interstate match against South Australia.

He returned to Corowa-Rutherglen in 2003 and was a member of their premiership winning team that year, before spending the 2004 season at Frankston YCW. From 2005 to 2007, Campbell was senior coach of Corowa-Rutherglen, during which time his father Rod was club president.
