= Brett MacKenzie =

Australian rules footballer

Brett Mackenzie

Personal information
- Full name: Brett Mackenzie
- Nickname: The Bad Macca *never had a footy card
- Born: 31 May 1968 (age 58)
- Original team: Corowa-Rutherglen
- Height: 193 cm (6 ft 4 in)
- Weight: 94 kg (207 lb)
- Position: Full back/centre half back

Playing career^{1}
| Years | Club | Games (Goals) |
| 1988 | North Melbourne | 1 (0) |
- ^{1} Playing statistics correct to the end of 1988.

Brett Mackenzie (born 31 May 1968) is a former Australian rules footballer who played with North Melbourne in the Victorian Football League (VFL).
