= Jim Hallahan Jr. =

Australian rules footballer (1911–1994)

Personal information
- Full name: James Patrick Hallahan
- Born: 16 December 1911; Rutherglen, Victoria
- Died: 23 November 1994 (aged 82); Wangaratta, Victoria
- Original team: Rutherglen
- Height: 178 cm (5 ft 10 in)
- Weight: 69 kg (152 lb)

Playing career^{1}
Years	Club	Games (Goals)
1935–1937	Footscray	17 (6)
1942–1944	Fitzroy	32 (7)
Total		49 (13)
- ^{1} Playing statistics correct to the end of 1944.

James Patrick Hallahan (16 December 1911 – 23 November 1994) was an Australian rules footballer with the Footscray Football Club and the Fitzroy Football Club in the Victorian Football League. He had a height of 178 cm and weight of 69 kg.

Hallahan commenced his footballing career with Rutherglen Football Club as a follower before being transferred to Footscray Football Club in 1935 where he played 17 games. For Fitzroy he played 32 games in three seasons during the second world war from 1942 until 1944.

In 1945 Hallahan, who came from Brighton under the "lease-lend" system, returned to the Brighton Football Club.

In 1946, Hallahan coached the Braybrook Football Club.

In 1947, Hallahan was captain-coach of the Coolamon Football Club in the South West Football League (New South Wales). Hallahan broke his collarbone late in the season and missed out on leading Coolamon into the SWDFL grand final, which they lost to Narrandera.

Jim was captain / coach of the Greta FC in the Ovens and King Football League from 1951 to 1953 and played in Greta's 1954 premiership side.

His father, Jim Hallahan Sr., played with St Kilda in 1904. Hallahan's son, Mike Hallahan, also played with Fitzroy in 1967.
