= Wahgunyah =

- Town
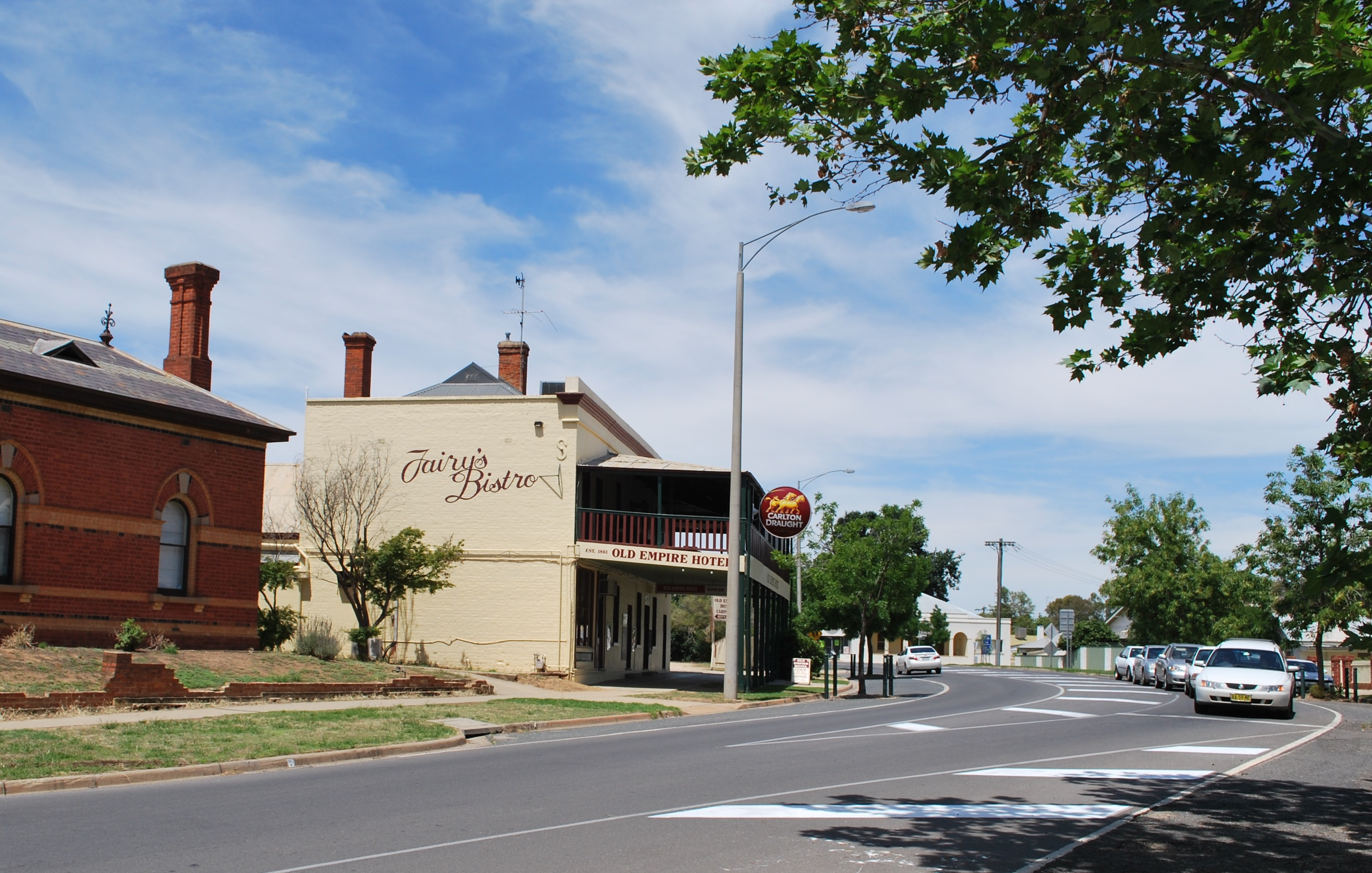
- The main street of Wahgunyah, 2009

- Coordinates: 36°00′33.3″S 146°23′39.3″E
- Country: Australia
- State: Victoria
- Region: Hume
- LGA: Shire of Indigo
- Location: 298 km (185 mi) NE of Melbourne; 51 km (32 mi) W of Wodonga; 9 km (5.6 mi) N of Rutherglen; 2 km (1.2 mi) S of Corowa

Government
  - State electorate: Benambra
  - Federal division: Indi
- Elevation: 143 m (469 ft)

Population
  - Total: 1,061 (2021 census)
- Postcode: 3687
- Mean max temp: 22.5 °C (72.5 °F)
- Mean min temp: 8.8 °C (47.8 °F)
- Annual rainfall: 539.4 mm (21.24 in)

Wahgunyah /wəˈɡʌnjə/ is a town in northeastern Victoria, Australia. The town is on the southern bank of the Murray River, opposite Corowa, New South Wales, in the Shire of Indigo. Wahgunyah is 298 kilometres (185 mi) north east of the state capital, Melbourne and 51 kilometres (32 mi) west of Albury/Wodonga. At the 2021 census, Wahgunyah had a population of 1,061.

The name is believed to be an Aboriginal phrase meaning the resting place of crows.

== History ==
=== Indigenous history ===
The Aboriginal people which inhabit the region around Corowa and Wahgunyah are the Bangarang people.

The tribe of Indigenous Australians that inhabited the Corowa area were called, in their own language, the Bangerang Tribe. The name has various spellings in English, varying all the way from Bandjalang through Panderang to Pinegorine.

=== Town history ===
The Wahgunyah cattle run was leased by John Foord and John Crisp in 1841. The township was established by Foord in 1856 and became important before the arrival of the railway in 1879 as the furthest upstream port on the Murray. The Post Office opened on 1 July 1858 and a school opened the same year.

All Saints Estate winery to the north of town was established in 1864 by Scottish emigrants George Sutherland Smith and John Banks and its extensive cellar building was, at least in part, modelled on the Castle of Mey near Smith and Banks's home town Caithness.

== Industry ==
The main factory of Uncle Tobys, the breakfast cereal arm of Nestlé, is on the outskirts of Wahgunyah. The other significant industry are the wineries which are part of the Rutherglen wine region.

== Sports and Recreation ==
=== Wahgunyah Football Club ===
The town has had an Australian rules football team since 1877 and Wahgunyah's first recorded match was against Corowa and was a return match against Corowa Football Club on Saturday, 16 June 1877, played "on the hill" in Corowa, with Wahgunyah winning the first encounter. Throughout 1877, there was talk of the Wahgunyah and Corowa Football Club's merging to form one stronger club and be called Border United Football Club. This merger actually took place and their first match as Border United was played against the Rutherglen Football Club in August 1877 and was captained by Jacob Levin. The Border United team wore pink and white colours. Border United FC remained in place until 1905, when they both entered stand alone teams in the Corowa District Football Association in 1906.

Wahgunyah have won the following seven senior football premierships in the Coreen & District Football League - 1948, 1949, 1968, 1997, 1998, 2002, 2004.

Wahgunyah played in the Chiltern & District Football Association between 1920 & 1921, 1923 - 1929, 1931 - 1937, 1950, 1953 - 1956, winning senior football premierships in 1955 and 1956.

At present (2021) compete in the Tallangatta & District Football League after having been in the Coreen & District Football League until 2007.

=== Other Sports ===
Wahgunyah was the former home of the Corowa Cougars rugby league club, based in nearby Corowa, who compete in the Goulburn Murray competition. The Cougars played their home fixtures on the Wahgunyah Recreation Reserve from their founding in 1987 until the early 1990s, during their time in the Group 13 Rugby League competition.

== See also ==
- Tallangatta & District Football League
- Uncle Tobys
