= Rutherglen, Victoria =

Rutherglen
- Town
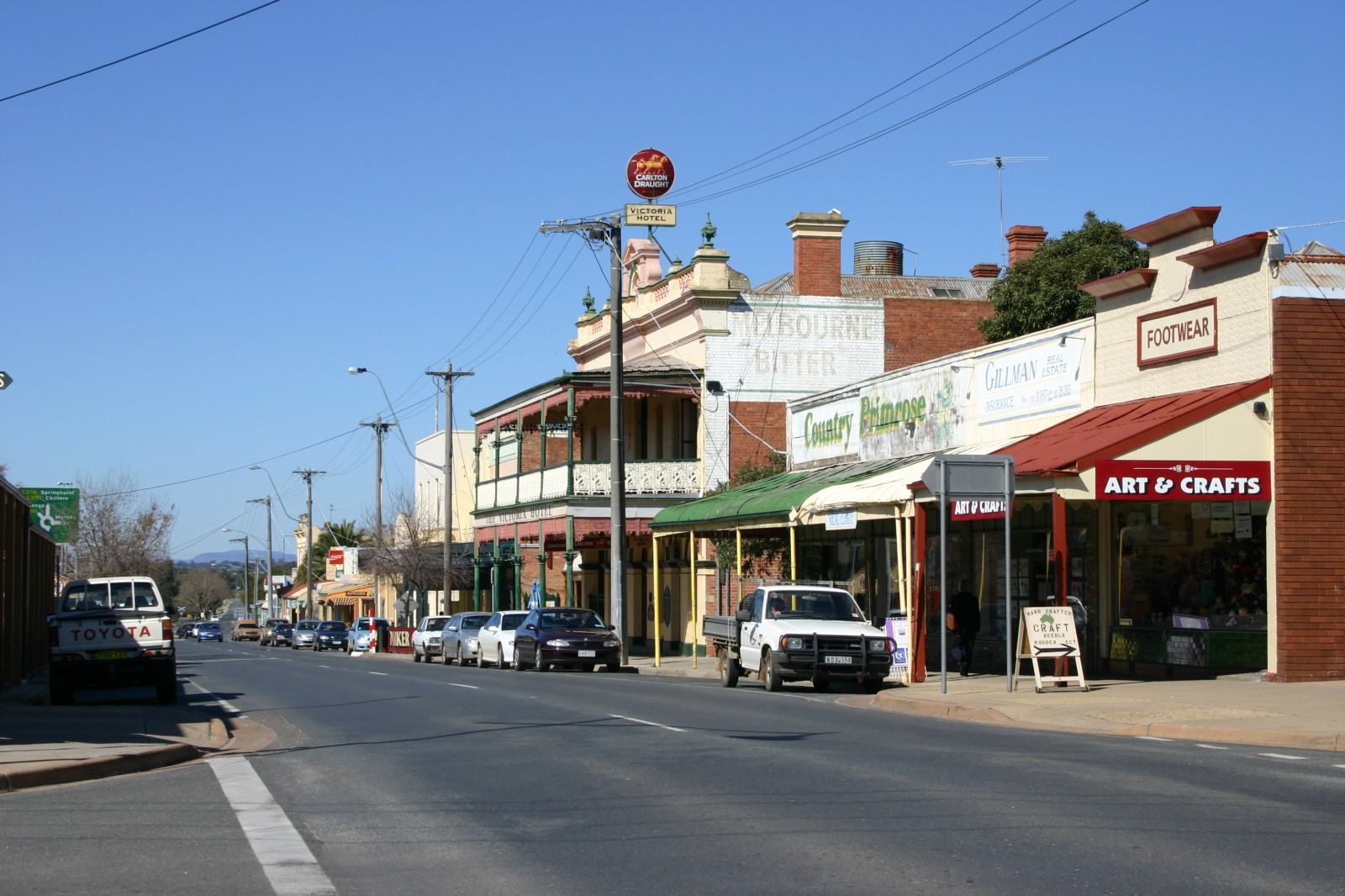
- The heritage listed Victoria Hotel in Main Street

- Interactive map of Rutherglen
- Coordinates: 36°03′20″S 146°27′45″E
- Country: Australia
- State: Victoria
- Region: Hume
- LGA: Shire of Indigo
- Location: 276 km (171 mi) NE of Melbourne; 45 km (28 mi) W of Wodonga; 15 km (9.3 mi) S of Corowa (NSW)

Government
  - State electorate: Benambra
  - Federal division: Indi
- Elevation: 175 m (574 ft)

Population
  - Total: 2,579 (2021 census)
- Postcode: 3685
- Mean max temp: 21.8 °C (71.2 °F)
- Mean min temp: 7.3 °C (45.1 °F)
- Annual rainfall: 581.4 mm (22.89 in)

Rutherglen is a town in north-eastern Victoria, Australia, near the Murray River border with New South Wales. The town was named after the Scottish town of Rutherglen which lies just outside Glasgow. At the 2021 census, Rutherglen had a population of 2,579.

== Features ==
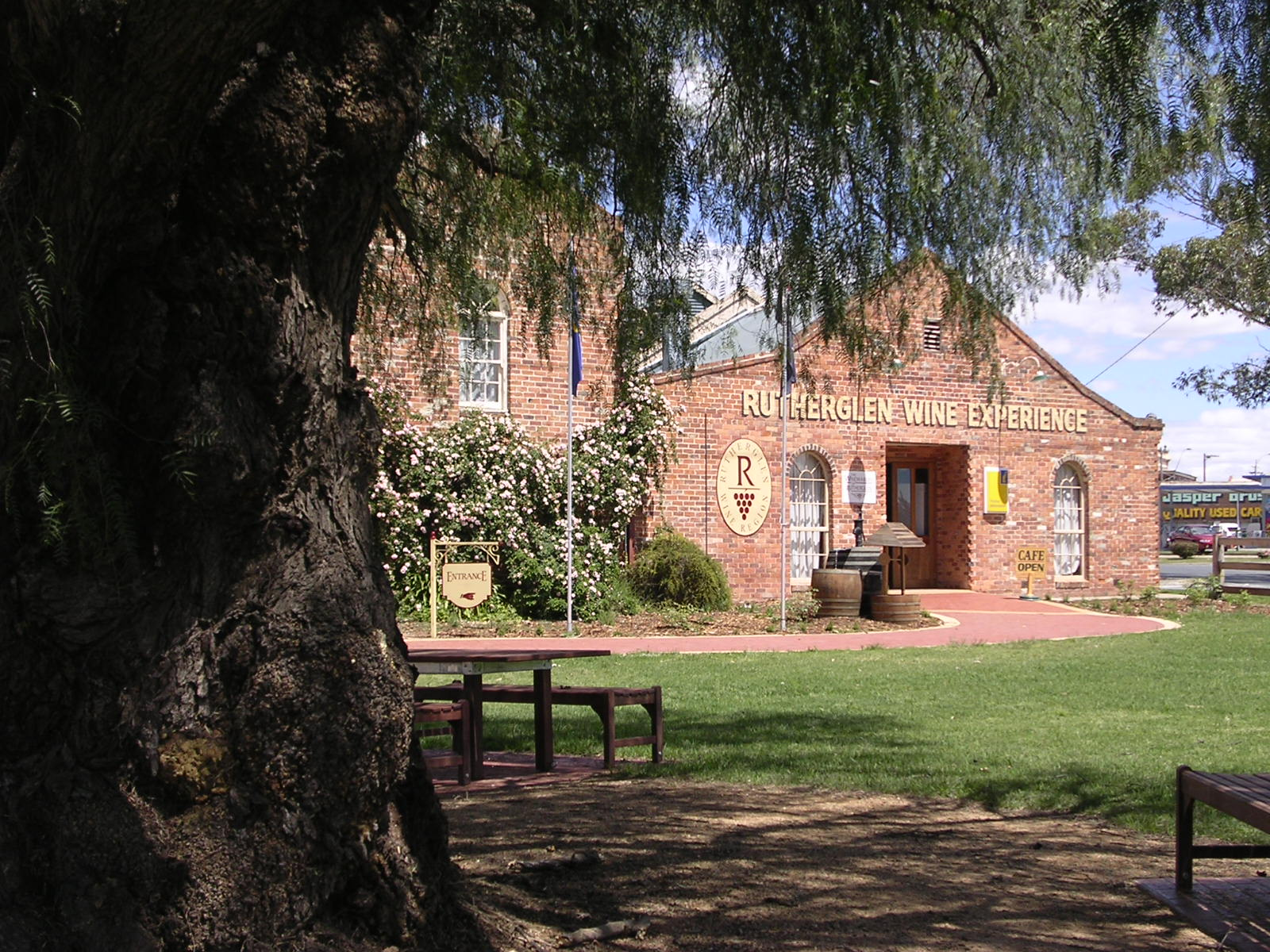
Rutherglen Wine Experience & Visitor Centre

Rutherglen is located north of Wangaratta and west of Wodonga, just 10 kilometres from the Murray River at the border towns of Wahgunyah and Corowa.

Originally a gold-mining town of the mid-19th century, it has since developed into a major wine-producing area, with 17 wineries all located within a short drive from the town centre.

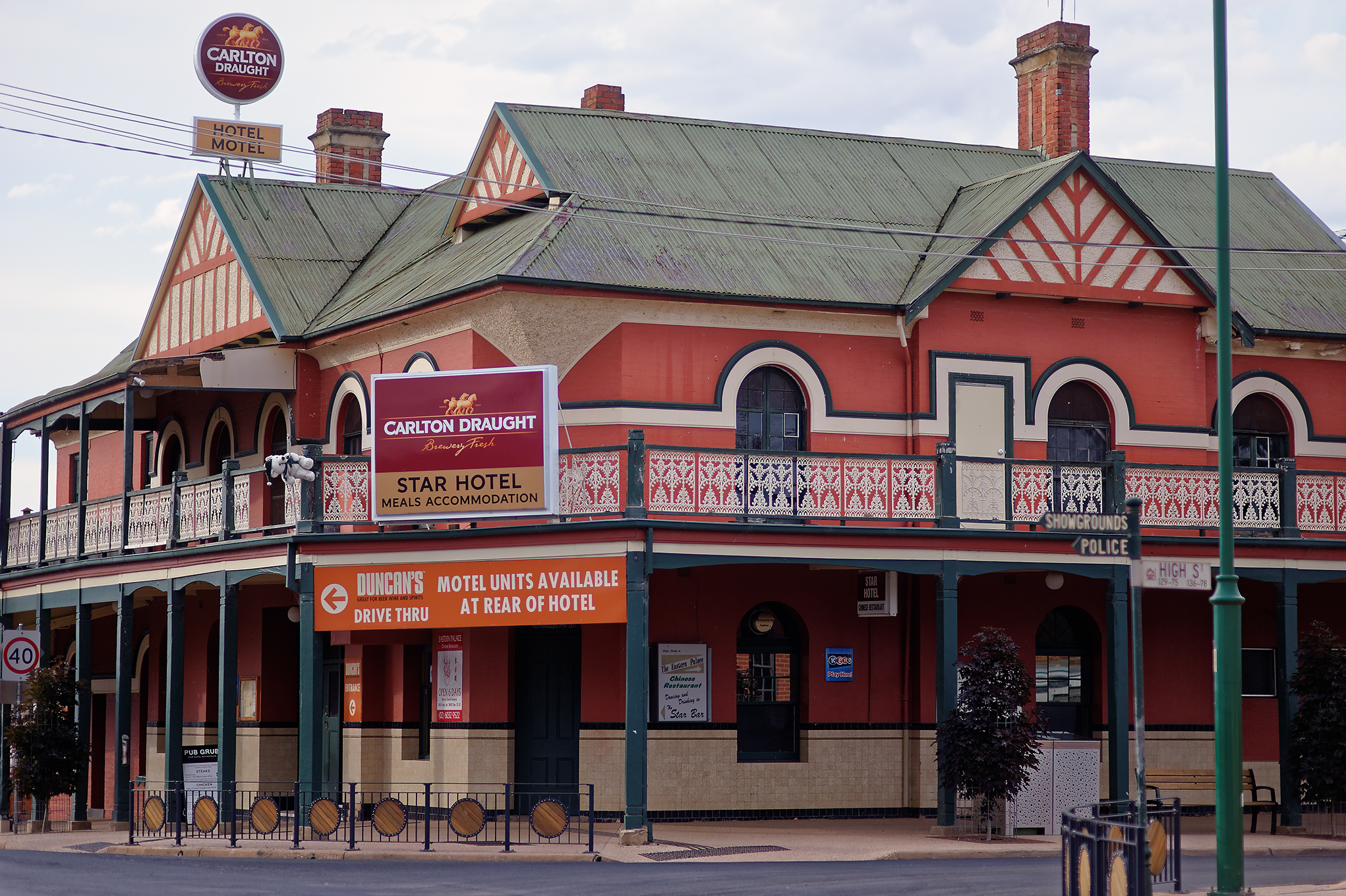
Star Hotel Main Street Rutherglen 2021

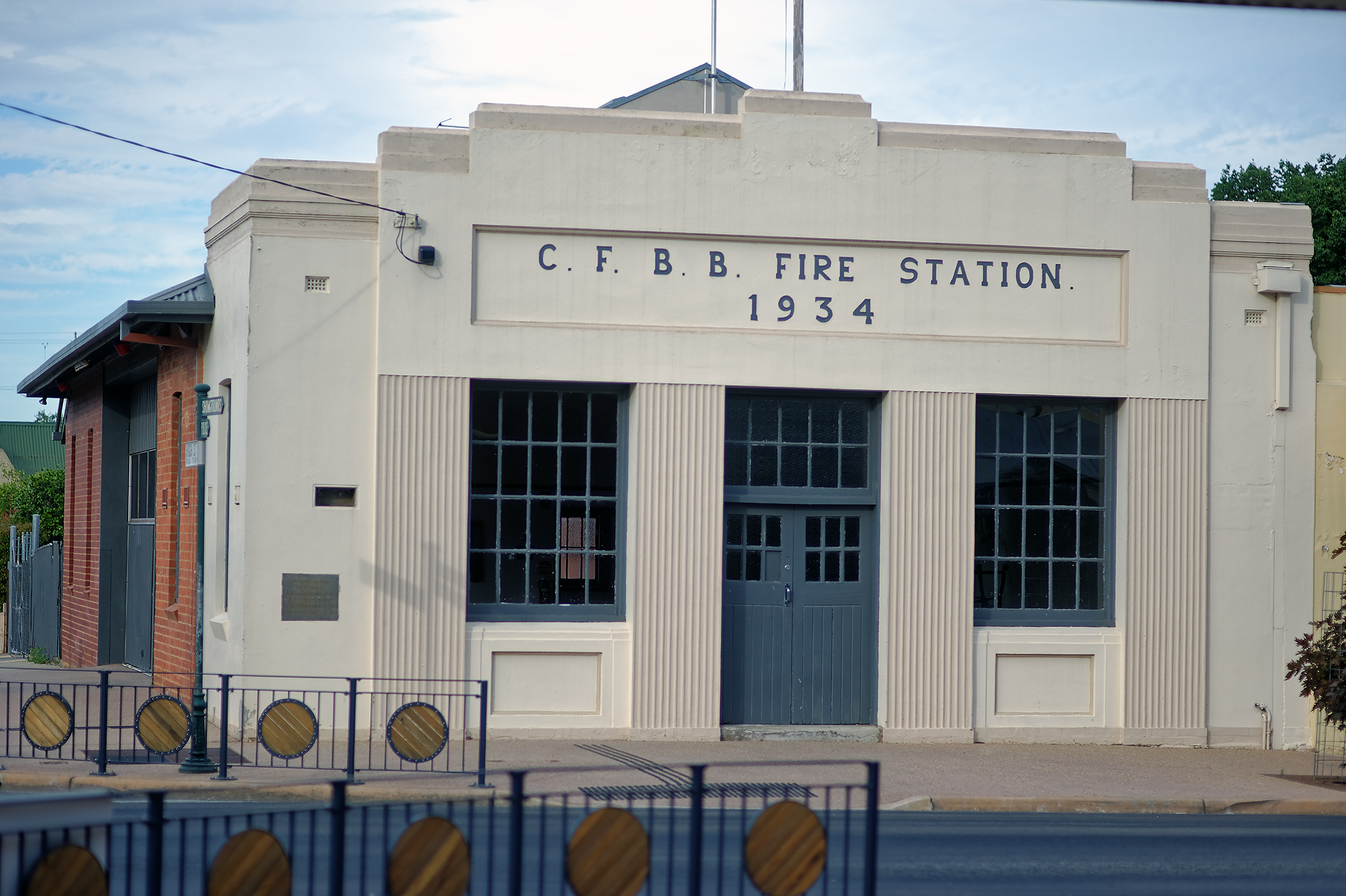
CFBB Fire Station Main Street Rutherglen 2021

The main street of Rutherglen maintains its historical charm, with most of the shop fronts retaining the same look they had a century ago. Attractions within the town include Lake King which is surrounded by Apex Park and Rutherglen Park, as well as the historical wine-bottle-shaped water tower in Campbell Street.

== History ==
Rutherglen Post Office opened on 1 November 1860. The Rutherglen Sun and Chiltern Valley Advertiser newspaper was published between 1886 and 1979.

The Rutherglen Magistrates' Court closed on 1 January 1990.

== Wine ==
The Rutherglen wine region is a wine-producing area around the town of Rutherglen and is particularly noted for its sweet fortified wine styles including Muscat, Topaque (formerly known as Tokay), and Port.

The largest winery in the region is the All Saints Winery, located just a short drive north-west outside of Wahgunyah. Established in 1864, it features landscaped gardens, ponds, a restaurant and wine tasting facilities. The Rutherglen Wine Experience Visitor Information Centre, located in the town centre on Main Street, offers displays of the town's rich history, how wines are made, and comprehensive tourist information.

== Sport ==
Unusually for a town of its size, Rutherglen has two Australian Rules football teams. The town in conjunction with nearby town Corowa has an Australian Rules football team (Corowa-Rutherglen) competing in the Ovens & Murray Football League. Another Australian rules football team, Rutherglen Football Club, play in the Tallangatta & District Football League.

Golfers play at the course of the Rutherglen Golf Club on Murray Street.

== Climate ==
Rutherglen features a borderline oceanic / humid subtropical climate (Cfb / Cfa), with warm to hot, dry summers and cool, damp winters. Climate data are sourced at Rutherglen Research; established in 1912 and still operating today. It sits at an elevation of 175 metres (574 ft).

The highest temperature recorded was 46.8 °C (116.2 °F) on 14 January 1939, whereas the lowest was −7.5 °C (18.5 °F) on 14 June 2006. The lowest maximum temperature was 3.0 °C (37.4 °F) on 3 July 1984.

Climate data for Rutherglen Research (1912–2024); 175 m AMSL; 36.10° S, 146.51° E
Month	Jan	Feb	Mar	Apr	May	Jun	Jul	Aug	Sep	Oct	Nov	Dec	Year
Record high °C (°F)	46.8 (116.2)	45.6 (114.1)	40.2 (104.4)	35.5 (95.9)	28.7 (83.7)	22.2 (72.0)	22.5 (72.5)	24.9 (76.8)	32.2 (90.0)	38.9 (102.0)	42.6 (108.7)	45.6 (114.1)	46.8 (116.2)
Mean daily maximum °C (°F)	31.5 (88.7)	30.8 (87.4)	27.4 (81.3)	22.0 (71.6)	17.0 (62.6)	13.4 (56.1)	12.5 (54.5)	14.1 (57.4)	17.2 (63.0)	21.0 (69.8)	25.4 (77.7)	29.3 (84.7)	21.8 (71.2)
Mean daily minimum °C (°F)	13.8 (56.8)	13.9 (57.0)	11.0 (51.8)	7.1 (44.8)	4.3 (39.7)	2.5 (36.5)	2.0 (35.6)	2.7 (36.9)	4.1 (39.4)	6.2 (43.2)	8.7 (47.7)	11.5 (52.7)	7.3 (45.2)
Record low °C (°F)	1.9 (35.4)	1.2 (34.2)	−0.9 (30.4)	−3.2 (26.2)	−6.1 (21.0)	−7.5 (18.5)	−6.9 (19.6)	−6.1 (21.0)	−5.3 (22.5)	−5.1 (22.8)	−2.8 (27.0)	0.0 (32.0)	−7.5 (18.5)
Average precipitation mm (inches)	38.8 (1.53)	37.2 (1.46)	39.2 (1.54)	40.2 (1.58)	51.5 (2.03)	56.5 (2.22)	60.2 (2.37)	60.2 (2.37)	54.1 (2.13)	58.0 (2.28)	46.4 (1.83)	44.1 (1.74)	586.4 (23.09)
Average precipitation days (≥ 0.2 mm)	5.3	4.9	5.3	6.8	9.9	12.6	14.4	14.0	10.9	9.8	7.7	6.3	107.9
Average afternoon relative humidity (%)	27	31	34	43	57	67	68	61	57	48	38	30	47
Mean monthly sunshine hours	313.1	282.5	272.8	228.0	161.2	120.0	127.1	173.6	207.0	260.4	276.0	288.3	2,710

== Notable people ==
- George Sutherland Smith (1830–1903), paddle-steamer captain and founder of All Saints winery
- Sir John Harris (1868–1946), politician and sherry pioneer
- Michael Joseph Savage (1872–1940), Prime Minister of New Zealand, lived at North Prentice
- Erle Cox (1873–1950), author
- Robert Campbell (born 1982), former Hawthorn footballer

== Festivals and events ==
- Rutherglen Regatta: second weekend of January
- Tastes of Rutherglen: second weekend of March - third weekend of March
- Roam Rutherglen (formerly known as Winery Walkabout): King's Birthday long weekend of June
- Rutherglen Agricultural Show: third weekend of October
- Tour de Rutherglen: first weekend of November
- Rutherglen Farmers Market: second weekend each month

== See also ==
- Australian wine
