= Rutherglen Football Club =

Australian rules football and netball club

Rutherglen Cats

Names
- Full name: Rutherglen Football & Netball Club
- Nickname: Cats

Club details
- Founded: 1979; 47 years ago (Note: The original "Rutherglen FC" had been founded in 1893. In 1978 this club merged with Corowa Spiders to form "Corowa-Rutherglen FC". Additionally surplus players formed the "Rutherglen-Corowa Cats" in 1979)
- Colours
- Competition: TDFL
- Premierships: CDFL (3): 1984, 1986, 1990
- Ground: Barkly Park, Rutherglen, Victoria

Uniforms
Home

The Rutherglen Football and Netball Club is an Australian rules football and netball club playing its home games in Rutherglen, Victoria, Australia. The current Rutherglen FNC was created after the merger of Ovens & Murray Football League sides Rutherglen and Corowa in 1979. Surplus players from the new Corowa-Rutherglen club reformed Rutherglen (initially as Rutherglen-Corowa) and played in the Coreen & District Football League for 13 years.

A stint in the Ovens & King Football League followed before moving to the Tallangatta & District Football League. The club dropped the Corowa part in its name in 2002.

== History ==
=== Predecessor club ===
The original Rutherglen FC was established in 1877, with the first recorded match being against Wahgunyah Football Club on Wednesday, 3 June 1877. Football was played intermittently in the club's formative years against other local towns and districts in the late 1870s and 1880s before it joined the Ovens And Murray Football Association in 1893 as one of four original teams. The club was based at Rutherglen's Barkly Park, located just off Reid Street and just north-west of the town's center. It was a powerhouse in the Ovens And Murray Football Association during its early days competing in many finals.

=== The birth of the Cats (1979) ===
Following the establishment of the Corowa-Rutherglen Roos in 1979, after the merger of the Corowa Spiders and the Rutherglen Redlegs, a number of surplus players decided to form the Rutherglen-Corowa Cats (known in some record books as the Corowa-Rutherglen Cats). Wearing a navy blue and white hooped jersey along with navy blue shorts and navy blue and white hooped socks for the majority of its history, the club was based at Barkly Park. It joined the Coreen & District Football League, based around the farming districts north of Corowa, New South Wales. The club enjoyed 13 short but successful seasons in the Coreen & District Football League, winning a total of 16 Premierships across the three respective grades, including three senior premierships from eight grand final appearances.

After the 1991 season the club left the New South Wales-based Coreen & District football League for the Victorian Ovens & King Football League, based around the greater Wangaratta area and encompassing many former gold-rush communities. It spent 11 seasons in the Ovens & King Football League, where neither the senior side nor the reserve side contested a grand final. However, the Under 16s contested four grand finals from 1999 to 2002, claiming the club's sole premiership in 2001 over Bright by 29 points at the Tarrawingee Rec Reserve. The club officially changed its name to the Rutherglen Football Club in 2002, dropping the Corowa name 23 years after the merger. At the end of the 2003 season, the Beechworth Football Club and the Rutherglen Football Club applied for an application to join the Tallangatta & District Football League, but were refused by the Ovens and King board. The clubs took an appeal to the Victoria Country Football League and won the right to join the Tallangatta & District Football League for the 2004 season.

The Victorian Tallangatta & District Football League is based around the small towns and farming districts near Tallangatta with every finals match being held at the Sandy Creek Oval, locally referred to as the "MCG of the Bush". Since joining, the club's jersey has been varied slightly to re-introduced the white monogrammed "RFC" of the Redlegs along with keeping the navy blue and white hoops of the Cats. While the club still hasn't tasted premiership success at senior or reserve levels after playing a number of final series, the club won its first Tallangatta & District Football League Premiership in 2007 when the Under 14s defeated Yackandanda by three points. Traditionally, the club does not play on the Queen's Birthday Weekend as the town hosts the annual Winery Walkabout. However, in 2016 the Corowa-Rutherglen Roos moved their OMFL and Round 11 match against the Wodonga Bulldogs to Barkly Park.

The club's numbers have continued to grow each season, including club staff, supporters and sponsors.

== Honours ==
=== Premierships and achievements ===
CDFL / Coreen & District Football League (1979–1991)
- Senior

Premierships (3): 1984, 1986, 1990

Runners-up (5): 1980, 1985, 1987, 1988, 1991.

Minor-premierships (2): 1987, 1990

- Reserve

Premierships (6): 1979, 1982, 1985, 1986, 1987, 1988.

Runners-up (5): 1980, 1981, 1984, 1989, 1991.

Minor-premierships (4): 1980, 1987, 1990, 1991.

- Thirds (Under 16's)

Premierships (7): 1980, 1981, 1982, 1983, 1984, 1985, 1990.

Runners-up (2): 1987, 1988.

Minor-premierships (1): 1983.

OKFL / Ovens & King Football League (1992–2003)
- Thirds (Under 16's)

Premierships (1): 2001.

Runners-up (3): 1999, 2000, 2002.

TDFL / Tallangatta & District Football League (2004-present)
- Thirds (Under 17's)

'Premierships (1) 2025. Runners-up (2): 2010, 2013.

Minor-premierships (2): 2010, 2013.

- Fourths (Under 14's)

Premierships (1): 2007.

Runners-up (1): 2010.

Minor-premierships (1): 2007.

=== Individual honours ===
CDFL / Coreen & District Football League (1979–1991)
- Reserve

Best & Fairest - "Lewis Family Trophy" (3): 1986 (C.Killeen), 1987 (C.Killeen), 1991 (A.Morris).

- Thirds (Under 16's)

Best & Fairest - "Lewis Family Trophy" (5): 1982 (P.Davidson), 1984 (N.Holten), 1985 (P.Weir), 1987 (C.Edmondson), 1990 (D.Shiers).

OKFL / Ovens & King Football League (1992–2003)
- Senior

Best & Fairest - "Clyde Baker Medal" (3): 1996 (Tony Gayfer), 1999 (R.Milthorpe), 2001 (Scott Francis).

Leading Goal Kicker medalist (2): 1996 (R.Robbins - 81), 1997 (P.Busch - 101).

- Reserve

Best & Fairest - "Ross Schutt (Chronicle) Medal" (5): 1994 (K.Renshaw), 1995 (A.Morris), 2000 (B.Renshaw), 2001 (B.Renshaw), 2002 (D.Hatton).

- Thirds (Under 16's)

Best & Fairest - "Fred Jensen Medal" (4): 1994 (M.Dowdle), 1996 (S.O’Keefe), 1997 (A.Howard), 2002 (J.Seymour).

TDFL / Tallangatta & District Football League (2004-present)
- Senior

Best & Fairest - "Barton Medal" (1): 2005 (B.Davis).

- Thirds (Under 17's)

Best & Fairest medalists (1): 2012 (M.Brennan - 36)

Leading Goal Kicker medalist (1): 2010 (D.Van Berlo - 50).

=== Team of the Century (1903–2003) ===
Team of the Century
B:	F. King	D. Sandral	L. Jackson
HB:	W. Francis	J. Sandral	J. Kingston
C:	A. Dunn	W. Gayfer	W. O'Donoghue
HF:	D. Carroll	N. Hawking	G. Tobias ^{1}
F:	A. Francis	R. Baker	A. McCauley
Foll:	M. Mills	J. King	J. Clancy
Int:	J. Lane	A. Way	C. Dickins
Coach:	P. Tossol		

Team ref

- Corowa (1903–78)
- Rutherglen (1903–78)
- Corowa-Rutherglen (1979–2003)

Notes

- ^{1} G. Tobias was named in the Team of the Century for his career with the Corowa FC. He was also a foundation player for the Corowa-Rutherglen FC in 1979

=== Hall of Famers ===
OMFL / Ovens & Murray Football League (Est. 2005)
- John Smith (Inducted: 2006)
- Jack King (Inducted: 2008)
- Frank Hodgkin (Inducted: 2011)
- William "Bill" Gayfer (Inducted: 2012)

OKFL / Ovens & King Football League (Est. 2006)
- Clem Goonan (Inducted: 2006)

== VFL/AFL players ==
The following footballers played with Rutherglen Corowa FC prior to playing senior AFL football.

- Coreen & District Football League
  - 1987 - Michael Gayfer - Collingwood
  - 1987 - John Longmire - North Melbourne
  - 1988 - Brett McKenzie - North Melbourne
  - 1988 - Mark O'Donoghue - North Melbourne
  - 1988 - Michael Garvey - Carlton Football Club
- Ovens & King Football League
  - 2002 - Robbie Campbell - Hawthorn (2002–2009) & Melbourne (2011)

The following footballers played VFL seniors prior to playing with RCFNC.

- 1984 - Vin Doolan - North Melbourne
- 2004? - Nicky Winmar - St Kilda (1987–1998) & Western Bulldogs (1999)

== See also ==
- Rutherglen Football Club (1893)
- Corowa Football Club
- Corowa-Rutherglen Football Club
