= Quirk =

Quirk or Quirks is having unconventional beliefs or manner, for example mispronouncing, in-jokes, clumsy and ditsy, and may refer to:

- The Quirk, a literary magazine
- "Quirks", a song by Ultravox! from the album Ha!-Ha!-Ha!
- 18376 Quirk, an asteroid
- Quirk Books, a Pennsylvania-based publishing company
- Quirks mode, a web browser technique for maintaining backwards compatibility
- Quirks (board game)
- Quirks, the superpower system in the anime and manga My Hero Academia

== People with the surname ==
- Agnes J. Quirk (1884–1974), American bacteriologist and inventor
- Alicia Quirk (born 1992), Australian rugby union player as "Alicia Lucas"
- Amelia Quirk (born 1999), British long-distance runner
- Art Quirk (1938–2014), American Major League Baseball player
- Barry Quirk, British borough councillor
- Bill Quirk (born 1946), American politician
- Billy Quirk (1873–1926), American silent film actor
- Brian Quirk (born 1968), American politician
- Bryan Quirk (born 1946), Australian rules footballer
- Cory Quirk (born 1986), American professional ice hockey player
- Daniel Quirk (1982–2005), American professional wrestler
- David Quirk (born 1981), Australian comedian and actor
- E. L. Quirk (1898–1967), Canadian Baptist missionary in India
- Ellison Quirk (1866–1938), Australian politician
- Francis Quirk (1907–1974), American artist, museum curator, and television personality
- Graham Quirk (born 1958), Australian politician
- Jane Quirk (1878–1949), American vaudeville performer
- Jim Quirk (born 1940s), American football official in the National Football League
- Joe Quirk, American author
- John Shirley-Quirk (1931–2014), British bass-baritone singer
- Josephine Quirk (1882–1976), American screenwriter and film producer
- Kathleen L. Quirk (c. 1963), American businesswoman
- Lawrence J. Quirk (1923–2014), American author, reporter, and film historian
- Les Quirk (born 1965), British Rugby League player
- Leslie Quirk (1914–2004), Manx language activist
- Margaret Quirk (born 1957), Australian politician
- Mary Quirk (1880–1952), Australian politician
- Matthew Quirk (born 1980), American novelist and journalist
- Moira Quirk (born 1968), English actress, voice actress, comedian and referee of Nickelodeon GUTS
- Peter Quirk (born 1961), Australian rules footballer
- Philip Quirk (born 1948), Australian photographer
- Randolph Quirk (1920–2017), British linguist and life peer
- Robert E. Quirk (1918–2009), American historian
- Roderic Quirk, American chemistry professor
- Seb Quirk (born 2001), English professional footballer
- Sharon Quirk-Silva (born 1962), American politician
- Tony Quirk (born 1956), Australian professional rugby league footballer
- Wendy Quirk (born 1959), Canadian Olympic swimmer
- William Thomas Quirk (1908–1977), Manx poet, composer, and teacher

=== Disambiguation pages ===
- Ed Quirk (disambiguation)
- James Quirk (disambiguation)
- John Quirk (disambiguation)

== Other uses ==
- Cool (aesthetic)
- Eccentricity (behavior)
- Goofball comedy

== See also ==
- Quirke (disambiguation), Irish surname
- Quirks & Quarks, a Canadian weekly science news program
- Quark (disambiguation)
