= Moama Historic Precinct =

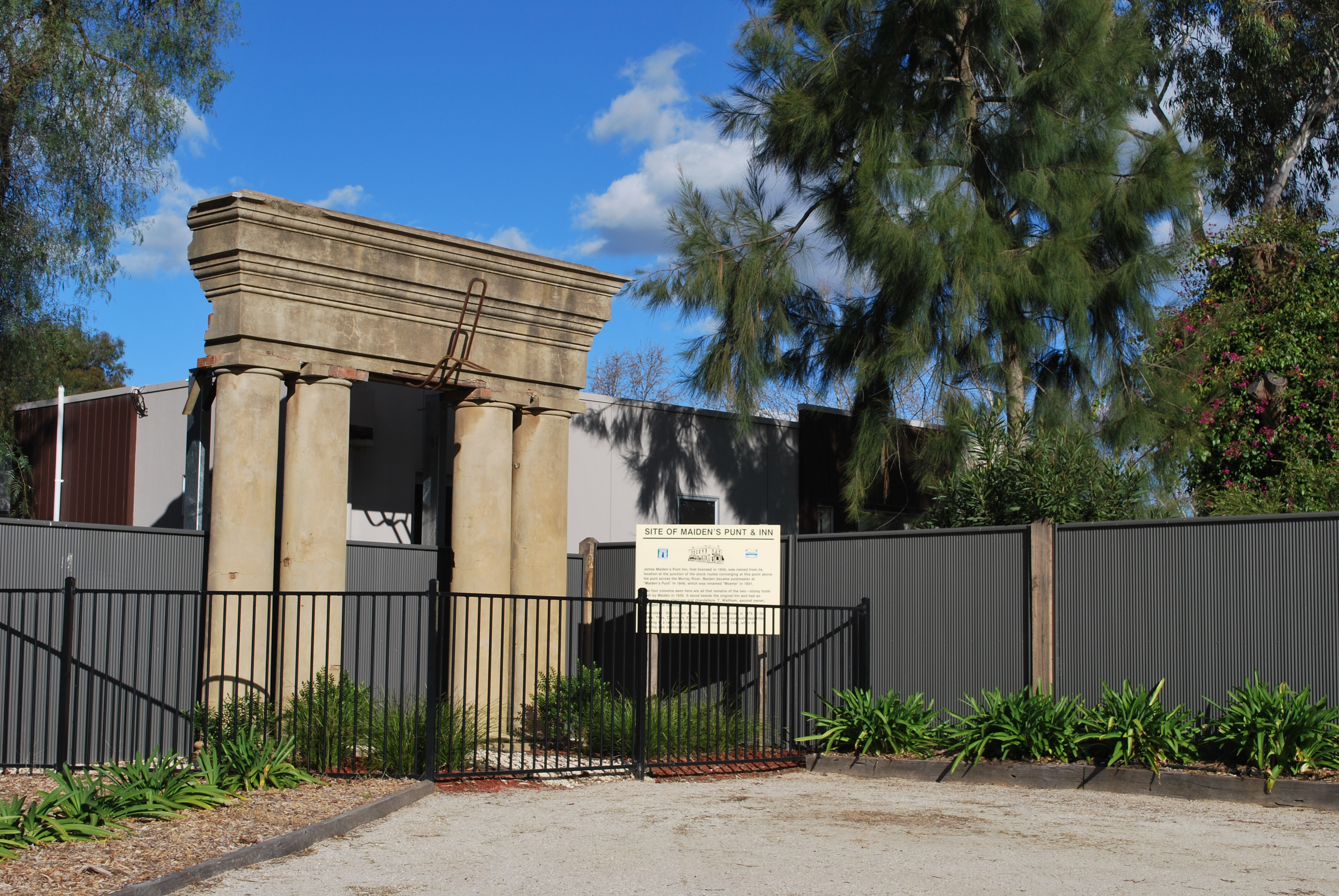
- Memorial at the site of the former Maiden's Punt and Inn, pictured in 2011.

- Location within New South Wales Location within Australia
- 36°07′10″S 144°45′03″E
- Location: Hunt Street, Moama, Murray River Council, New South Wales, Australia

New South Wales Heritage Register
- Official name: Moama Historic Precinct; Echuca – Moama Bridge; Echuca Wharf; Murray River (part of)
- Type: State heritage (complex / group)
- Designated: 2 April 1999
- Reference no.: 600
- Type: Historic Landscape
- Category: Landscape – Cultural

The Moama Historic Precinct is a heritage-listed abandoned settlement location, river wharf and public space on Hunt Street, Moama, New South Wales, Australia. It includes the Echuca – Moama Bridge and the Echuca Wharf on the Victorian side of the river. It was added to the New South Wales State Heritage Register on 2 April 1999.

== History ==
Prior to European occupation, the Aboriginal inhabitants of the Echuca/Moama area were the Jodajoda. The Yorta Yorta was a language group, the members of which it occupied the area around Echuca to Cobram and south to Shepparton. They were alternatively known as the Bangarang (Bangerang). The present-day Aboriginal inhabitants of traditional Yorta Yorta land refer to themselves as the Yorta Yorta Nation.

Early European exploration in the Echuca/Moama region

The Murray and Campaspe rivers have been of major importance to the development of the Echuca-Moama region. The area came to the attention of European colonists in the late 1830s as pastoralists drove cattle and sheep inland along these major rivers in search of grazing land. In early 1838 Hawdon and Bonney passed through Echuca in the vicinity of present-day Radcliffe St, and provided some of the earliest descriptions of the land and Aboriginal inhabitants of Echuca before crossing the Campaspe south of present-day Rotary Park. Charles Sturt followed their route in mid-1838. By 1841, pastoral holdings had been established north along the Campaspe River to its junction with the Murray and on both sides of the Murray River.

1840s–50s – Pastoralists. John Maiden and the development of Moama

The pastoral boom of the 1840s and early 50s required vast herds of sheep and cattle to be moved overland to markets. The Moama area became known as a desirable place to cross the Murray due to the slope of the riverbanks at this point, and the fact that it was the shortest distance to Melbourne from the Murray. In 1842, James Maiden and his wife were two of the first residents on the NSW side of the Murray, living at Perricoota Station, where Maiden was superintendent. Maiden took full advantage of the huge volume of traffic heading to meat and wool markets in Melbourne by establishing a settlement at present-day Moama.

In 1844 he built a punt across the Murray, soon replaced with a larger one in 1845, one mile east of present-day Moama. In 1846 he established the Junction Inn near his punt, providing accommodation, liquor and stabling for those waiting to cross the river. Maiden became rich from the volume of traffic as well as his cattle dealings. A small settlement, owned largely by Maiden, grew up around the river crossing. In 1846 a mail service to "Maiden's Punt" commenced; John Maiden was at this time punt owner, innkeeper, postmaster and cattle dealer.

In 1851 Maiden's Punt became known officially as Moama. The Bendigo gold rush in the early 1850s increased the demand for meat. Maiden established slaughter yards on Perricoota station, and by 1854, Moama was the largest cattle market outside Melbourne. James Maiden had become owner of Perricoota station and was regarded as a millionaire. However, in the mid 1850s the cattle market crashed, and James Maiden's fortunes (and Moama) entered a period of decline. In 1861 Maiden sold off all his holdings and left the area. The remains of the Junction Inn are located in Chanter St.

1850s – Hopwood and the development of Echuca

During the 1840s, Echuca did not exist. James Maiden held a monopoly over river crossings and his settlement in NSW in Moama. Henry Hopwood arrived near Moama in 1849. He attempted to establish a rival punt and various enterprises on the banks of the Murray but encountered such strong opposition from squatters that in 1852 he was "chased out" of NSW and moved to a pastoral holding across the river in Victoria.

With the Victorian goldfields creating demand for meat and transport, Hopwood competed directly with Maiden for a monopoly over river crossing trade, and was quoted as vowing to "put Moama in the Murray". He proceeded to establish a small settlement on the Victorian side of the river, known for a short time as "Hopwoods ferry" before being surveyed as Echuca in 1854. Between 1854 and 1857 Hopwood established a punt, inn, two stores, two smiths, a doctor and a bakery to cater for travellers and residents. As the cattle market crashed and the fortunes of Maiden and other squatters declined in NSW, Hopwoods influence in Victoria grew. In 1859 he built a pontoon bridge and the grand "Bridge Hotel" to garner the increasing coach traffic from Melbourne. Hopwood remained an influential figure until the development of other transport technologies.

1860s–1880s Echuca – transport, sawmilling and agriculture

The introduction of steamboats in 1853 and the completion of the Melbourne-Echuca railway line in 1864 saw Echuca became a major transport and sawmilling centre. Both steamers and railroads required wood in the form of fuel or sleepers, and so the logging of redgum forests surrounding Echuca-Moama also became a major source of employment. The settlement of Echuca spread to Echuca East, where most sawmilling was concentrated, and south along the major highways. There was also commercial and residential expansion along the railway line.

By 1872 the Port of Echuca was the centre of a trade network involving the transport of wool and other goods by steamer and then by train to markets. After this time, however, the spread of railway construction across Victoria eroded the commercial viability of river transport. In 1875 construction began on the iron rail and road bridge which crosses the Murray today. The Shinbone Alley settlement, home to many of the construction workers, flourished in the Banyule Forest east of the bridge. The bridge was complete in 1878, but remained unopened until the 1879 "Bridge Riot" when residents opened the bridge themselves. The steamer trade declined slowly from this time onwards.

Between 1877 and 1881 the profitable redgum sawmilling industry in Echuca declined drastically. In an attempt to regulate the massive deforestation of redgum forests, the Victorian government introduced a heavy tax on redgum in 1877. By 1878, 1000 people were unemployed in Echuca, and although the tax was repealed in 1881, most of the redgum trade had already been lost to mills in NSW which were not subject to the tax. This had a large impact on the settlements of Echuca East, which were closely tied to the sawmilling industry. In 1881 the Murray River Sawmills company was formed when several sawmillers banded together to keep their industry going. A sawmill still operates in Echuca today under the same name and on the same site. Logging of redgum has continued ever since although at substantially reduced levels.

The 1860s saw the establishment of market gardening as an industry in the Echuca - Moama area. The first Chinese market gardeners arrived in Echuca in 1865, and in 1887 there were 10 gardens supplying the Echuca area with fresh vegetables as well as growing tomatoes for the tomato processing industry. Land selectors also took up land to the south and west of Echuca during the 1870s.

Developments occurred more slowly across the river at Moama. In 1870 the settlement was completely inundated by a huge flood, and most of its 40 buildings were swept away. However the town was rebuilt, and the population increased around the settlement due to the subdivision of pastoral properties under Land Selection Acts, and the opening of the Deniliquin-Moama railway line in 1875.

1880s to World War 1

In 1881 the population of Echuca was 4789, and Moama 700. Both centres declined slightly over the next 3 decades as a result of economic and technological changes. In addition to the decline of the port and sawmilling industries, the economic depression of the 1890s reduced the volume of goods passing through Echuca. Established trades such as blacksmith, wheelwright, coachbuilder and saddler all declined in importance with increasing popularity of motorised transport after 1910. The loss of a large number of males from the population from 1914 onwards meant that the river transport and sawmilling industries would never be revived.

However, agriculture and dairying in the surrounding district took on greater importance with the subdivision of land for farm allotments. In 1894, Echuca Village was established under the Victorian government's Village Settlement Scheme, which was designed to ease poverty caused by the depression. Settlers were given the opportunity to acquire freehold land if conditions regarding payment and land usage were met. Despite individual failures, the village persisted and by the 1920s had become a productive farming area. In 1906 closer settlement schemes brought many small farmers to the districts south and west of Echuca. Chinese market gardeners continued to flourish in the area, and production of fruit and vegetables peaked in the period prior to WWI.

The interwar period - continued agricultural development

Echuca-Moama began to revive economically in the 1920s after returned soldiers arrived to take up farming or open businesses. Dairying continued to develop south and west of Echuca. The population north-west of Moama increased with the opening of a railway line to Balranald. Echuca remained a commercial centre throughout the depression of the 1930s, when rabbiting became a major source of support for many families. Market gardening was continued by Spanish immigrants and a few remaining Chinese gardeners, despite the White Australia Policy that resulted in a decline in the number of Chinese immigrants permitted to enter Australia.

Post World War 2 – manufacturing and tourism

During World War II Echuca East was revived economically with the construction of an ordnance factory and housing for workers. This continued post WW2 when the factory was bought by the United Bearing Corporation. After WW2, returned soldiers again boosted the economy through house construction, establishing businesses or farms. Agricultural and dairy industries continued to support a flour mill, butter factory and tomato processing plant.

The Port of Echuca wharf was partly demolished in 1944, but with increasing development and modernisation away from the old Echuca district in the 1950s and 1960s, some residents developed an appreciation of Echuca's history. Plans to restore the Port of Echuca were developed in the 1960s and completed in 1974. From the mid-1970s to the present, tourism has become a major industry in Echuca-Moama. The restoration of steamboats as part of the tourism industry continued in Echuca, and in Moama landscape and restoration works were undertaken at Horseshoe Lagoon and the wharf. The economic boom of the 1980s saw continued building and commercial developments in both Echuca and Moama.

== Description ==
The Moama Historic Precinct includes the Echuca Road/Rail bridge and the Echuca Wharf facing it downstream. The area was once the site of Chinese market gardens, houses, a saw mill, a thriving ship building business and one of the busiest boat slips on the Murray River.

The land is now open red gum forest with minimal use, but there are still remains of the boat slip and associated machinery and the hulks of two large river barges lie nearby.

== Heritage listing ==
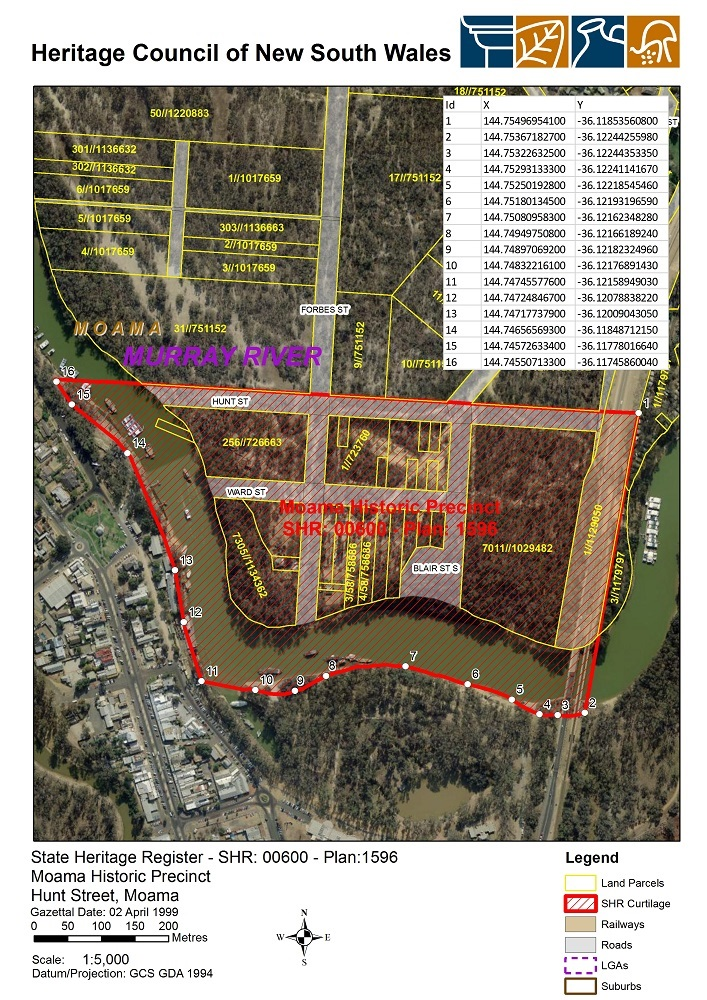
Heritage boundaries

Moama Historic Precinct was listed on the New South Wales State Heritage Register on 2 April 1999 having satisfied the following criteria.

The place is important in demonstrating the course, or pattern, of cultural or natural history in New South Wales.

The Moama Historic precinct, including the Echuca Rail/Road bridge and the Echuca Wharf demonstrates pivotal technological changes in the transportation of Australia's produce.
