= Quirky (disambiguation) =

Quirky is another name for eccentric behavior or something out of the ordinary in general.

It may also refer to:

- Quirky (company), an industrial design company
  - Quirky, a 2011 reality television show set at the company that aired on the Sundance Channel
- Quirky subject, a linguistic phenomenon
- Quirky!, an abstract strategy board game; see List of board games
- Quirky Linux, an experimental Linux distribution related to Puppy Linux
- Quirky (book), a 2018 book by Melissa Schilling

== See also ==
- Quirk (disambiguation)
