= PS Success =

Historic Australian paddle steamer

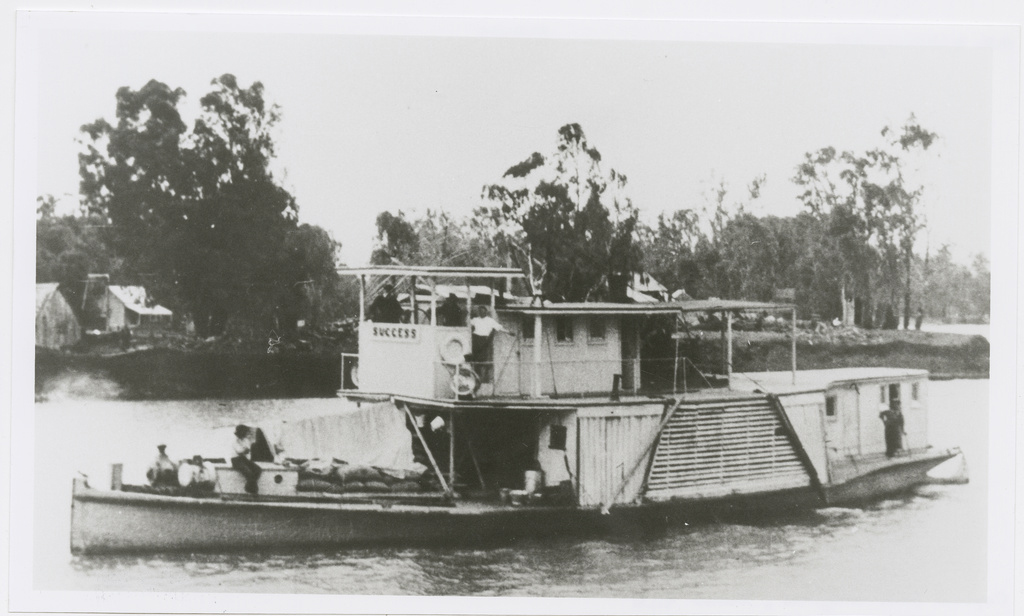
- PS Success; State Library of SA: [B 63241/40]

History

Australia
- Name: Success
- Owner: Westwood & Air (first owners)
- Operator: G.B. Air
- Route: River Murray, Australia
- Laid down: 1877
- Out of service: 1957
- Home port: Mildura, Australia
- Fate: Wreck
- Status: Restoration project

General characteristics
- Length: 82 ft 1 in (25.02 m)
- Beam: 16 ft 2 in (4.93 m)
- Draught: 5 ft 11 in (1.80 m)
- Propulsion: Steam
- Notes: Data compiled from several sources

PS Success is a historic paddle steamer in Victoria, Australia. Originally built as a snagging steamer in June 1877, it is currently being restored by the Port of Echuca to full working order. When operational, it will be added to the fleet of paddle steamers at Echuca Wharf.

During her working life, the Success spent her working days towing barges containing red gum, wool, and other cargo along the river system, while also operated as a passenger vessel between Swan Hill and Mildura during the years of 1915–1916. The Success was also used to rescue sheep from flooded stations during the 1956 Murray River flood.

In 1996, decades after being abandoned near Neds Corner station, the remains of the Success were recovered and moved to the Old Mildura Homestead. After almost 10 years of restoration efforts made by volunteers, the hull was relocated to the Port of Echuca with intention of further restoration.

== Particulars ==
PS Success measures over 82 feet long and 16 feet wide.
