= Quark (disambiguation) =

A quark is an elementary particle.

Quark may also refer to:

- "Quark", a nonce word in James Joyce's Finnegans Wake, and the origin of the particle name

== Computing ==
- Quark (company), a software manufacturer
- Quark (kernel), a microkernel used in the MorphOS operating system
- QuArK or Quake Army Knife, a game editor
- Quark (hash function), a cryptographic hash function
- Intel Quark, a line of CPUs designed for small size and low power consumption
- Quarks, X resources representing strings using integers
- BlackBerry Quark, a line of smartphones

== Entertainment ==
=== Music ===
- Quark Records, a former name of Emanem Records
- Quark, a 1980 album by Japanese jazz fusion artist Jun Fukamachi
- "Quark" (song), a 1994 song by German rock band Die Ärzte
- "Quark", a 1995 song by BT from Ima
- "Quarks", an electronic dance music duo composed of Camellia and kradness

=== Fictional characters ===
- Quark (Star Trek), in the television series Star Trek: Deep Space Nine
- Captain Qwark, a character in Ratchet & Clank video games
- Quark, in Valhalla
- Quark, a Marvel Comics character often associated with Longshot
- Quark, a type of robot from Doctor Who TV series
- Quark, a white dragon from Lunar: The Silver Star and its remakes
- Quark, the family dog in Honey, I Shrunk the Kids
- Quark, in Zero Escape: Virtue's Last Reward
- Quark, a character from Danger Mouse

=== Other entertainment uses ===
- Quark/, four books of original short stories and poetry published in 1970 and 1971
- Quark (TV series), a short-lived 1977/1978 science fiction sitcom
- Quark!, the pre-launch proposed name for Science Channel
- Quarks (TV series), a German science journalism program

== Other uses ==
- Quark (technical festival), an annual technical festival
- Quark (dairy product), a type of fresh dairy product similar to cottage cheese
- Peugeot Quark, a concept car

== See also ==
- Quark, Strangeness and Charm, an album by Hawkwind
  - "Quark, Strangeness and Charm" (song), the title track of this album
- Quirks & Quarks, a Canadian weekly science news program
- Quirk (disambiguation)
- Cark, a village in Cumbria, England
