= Dick Robertson =

Dick Robertson may refer to:

- Dick Robertson (songwriter) (1903–1979), American big band singer of the 1920s
- Dick Robertson (baseball) (1891–1944), American baseball pitcher
- Dick Robertson (footballer) (1877–1936), Australian rules footballer
