= Phil McCumisky =

Australian rules footballer

Personal information
- Full name: Philip Bernard McCumisky
- Born: 28 May 1897; Echuca, Victoria
- Died: 2 August 1970 (aged 73); Fitzroy, Victoria
- Original team: Old Xaverians

Playing career^{1}
| Years | Club | Games (Goals) |
| 1917–19 | Carlton | 9 (0) |
- ^{1} Playing statistics correct to the end of 1919.

Philip Bernard McCumisky (28 May 1897 – 2 August 1970) was an Australian rules footballer who played with Carlton in the Victorian Football League (VFL).

He later served in a variety of administrative roles at Carlton, including serving as the Blues’ honorary doctor for almost 20 years.
