= Moama =

- Town
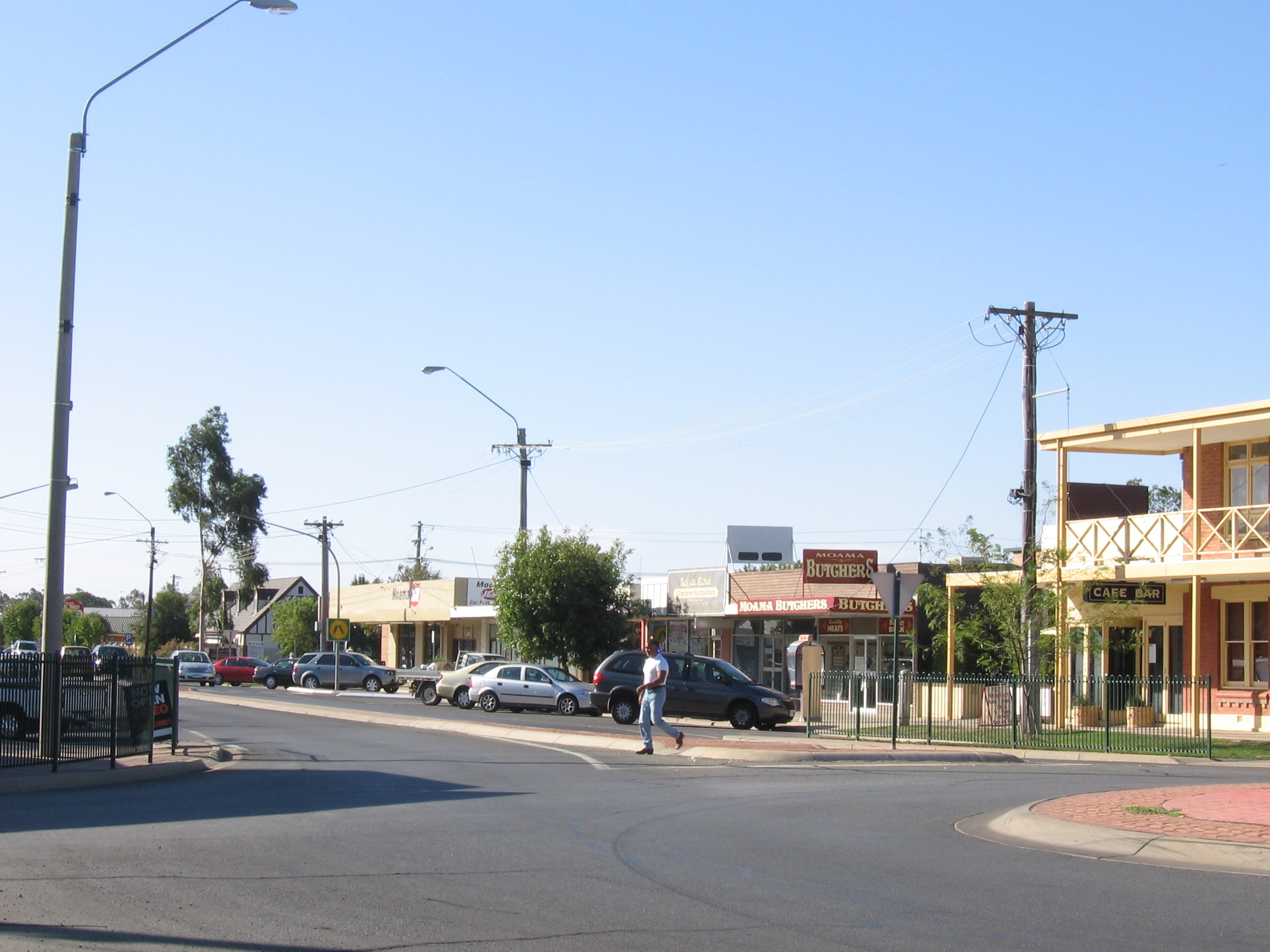
- Main street looking north

- Coordinates: 36°5′0″S 144°45′0″E
- Country: Australia
- State: New South Wales
- LGA: Murray River Council
- Location: 638 km (396 mi) from Sydney; 190 km (120 mi) from Melbourne; 73 km (45 mi) from Deniliquin; 3 km (1.9 mi) from Echuca
- Established: 1851

Government
  - State electorate: Murray
  - Federal division: Farrer
- Elevation: 99 m (325 ft)

Population
  - Total: 7,213 (2021 census)
- Postcode: 2731
- County: Cadell

Moama (/moʊɑːmə/ or /moʊæmə/) is a town in the Murray region of southern New South Wales, Australia, in the Murray River Council local government area. The town is directly across the Murray River from the larger town of Echuca in the neighbouring state of Victoria, to which it is connected by a bridge. At the 2016 census, Moama had a population of 5,620.

== History ==
=== Maiden's Punt ===
The settlement where Moama now stands was founded by James Maiden in the mid-1840s, beginning as a stopping-point for stock and cargo waiting to cross the Murray River by punt. Maiden arrived in the district in 1840; he had been hired to caretake Jeffries' station about 40 kilometres (25 mi) from the junction of the Campaspe River and the Murray River. He recognised a business opportunity and travelled to Seymour where he built a punt, which he then transported back to the Murray. The locality where the place was placed on the river became known as Maiden's Punt. Maiden built a wooden public house, the Junction Inn, for which he obtained a licence in 1847.

During this early period Maiden's punt operated in opposition to another punt, owned by Isaac White, which was worked from the southern bank at Campaspe Junction (now Echuca). However, it was Maiden's punt that captured most of the business.

=== Moama ===
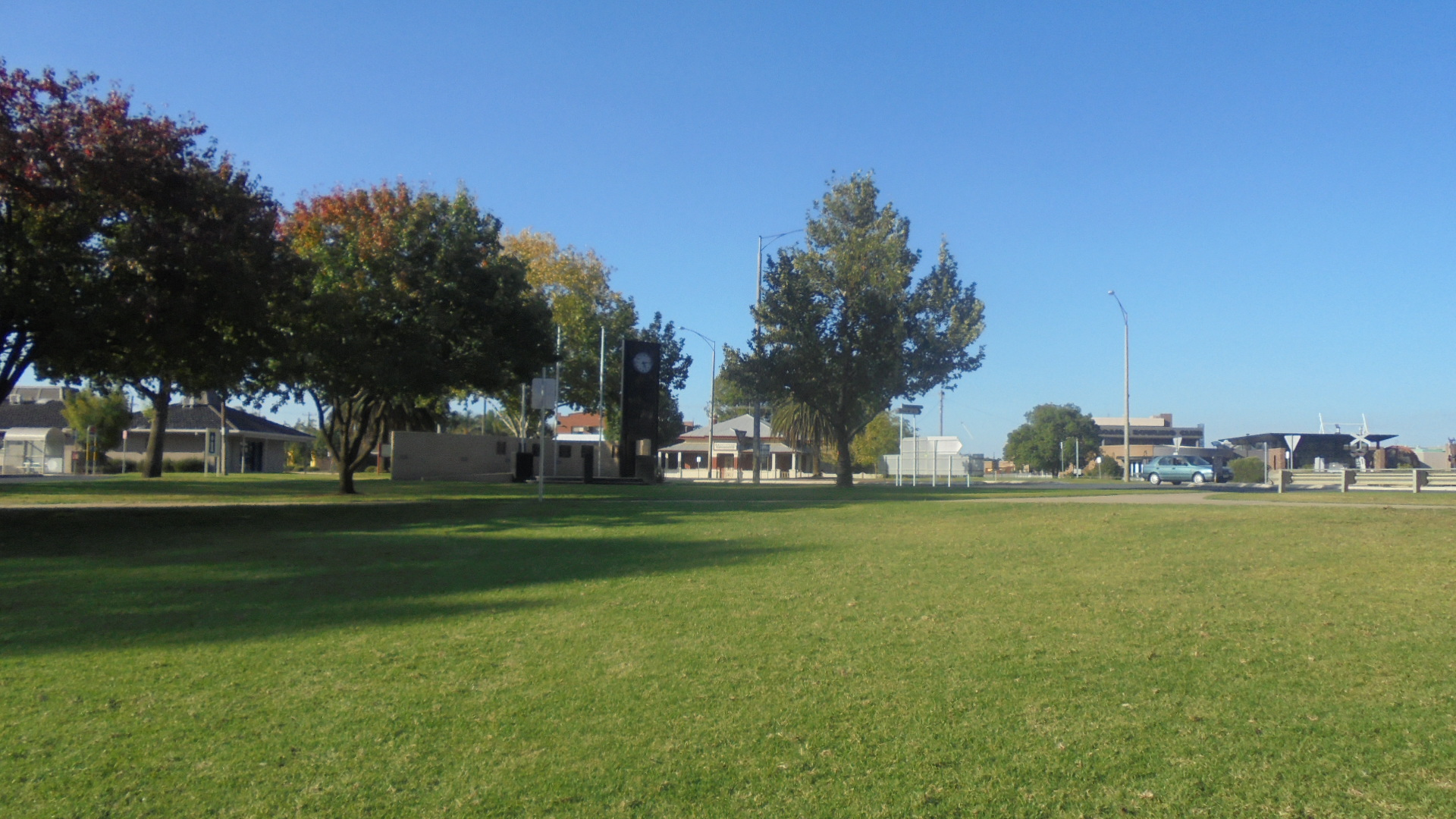
A park in Moama

A demand for land at Maiden's Punt prompted the Government of New South Wales to lay out a township there, named Moama. The name is derived from a local indigenous word meaning "burial ground". The Moama township was gazetted on 16 December 1851. The post office opened on 1 January 1855 and was known as Maiden's Punt until 1857.

At a land sale in August 1855 James Maiden purchased 10 of the 30 lots sold. Maiden sold the Junction Inn to Jeremiah Rolfe in 1855, but the next year he repurchased it. When applying for a licence he told the Bench of Magistrates that he "intended to conduct it in a very superior manner with reduction of charges." Maiden also intended expanding the hotel, utilising the brick house which was his former residence as accommodation "for the use of gentlemen and their families to and from Melbourne".

The growth of the paddlesteamer as a means for transporting cargo from the 1860s onwards saw both Moama and Echuca grow substantially. Echuca's large wharf and its relatively short distance to Melbourne saw it overshadow its cross-border neighbour.

A traveller passing through Moama in mid-1865 described the township thus: "Here are erected a few straggling houses of wood or brick". By that stage Moama and Echuca were connected by a pontoon bridge, which, though too narrow for drays or coaches, was used for crossing sheep and horses.

Moama retains some impressive historical buildings (circa 1880s), namely the Moama Court House on Francis Street, the former New South Wales Police Force Sergeants official residence in Chanter Street, and the former Bank of New South Wales adjacent to the railway lines on Meninya Street.

== Demographics ==
According to the 2021 Census:

- The population was 7,213, comprising 3,501 (48.5%) males and 3,711 (51.5%) females.
- Aboriginal and Torres Strait Islander people constituted 3.9% of the population and non-Indigenous constituted for 90.3%.
- 3,101 (43%) of people have English ancestry, 3,014 (41.8%) have Australian ancestry, 844 (11.7%) have Irish ancestry, 827 (11.5%) have Scottish ancestry and 291 (4%) have Italian ancestry.
- 6,132 (85%) were born in Australia, 174 (2.4%) were born in England, 56 (0.8%) were born in New Zealand, 42 (0.6%) were born in India, 30 (0.4%) were born in the Netherlands and 28 (0.4%) were born in Scotland.

As for religious affiliation:

- Christians constituted 68.2% of the population with the largest denominations being Catholicism (31.2%), Anglicanism (22.3%) and Uniting Church (11%) and other Christians constituted 1.4%.
- People having no religion accounted for 25.5% of the population.
- 6% of the population did not state their religion.

Historical population
Year	Pop.	±%
1921	713	—
1933	779	+9.3%
1947	662	−15.0%
1954		—
1961		—
1966	342	—
1971	1,126	+229.2%
1976	1,202	+6.7%
1981	1,507	+25.4%
1986	1,924	+27.7%
1991	2,263	+17.6%
1996	2,469	+9.1%
2001	2,818	+14.1%
2006	3,331	+18.2%
2011	4,198	+26.0%
2016	5,620	+33.9%
2021	6,654	+18.4%
Source: Australian Bureau of Statistics data.

== Heritage listings ==
Moama has a number of heritage-listed sites, including:

- Hunt Street: Moama Historic Precinct

== Facilities ==
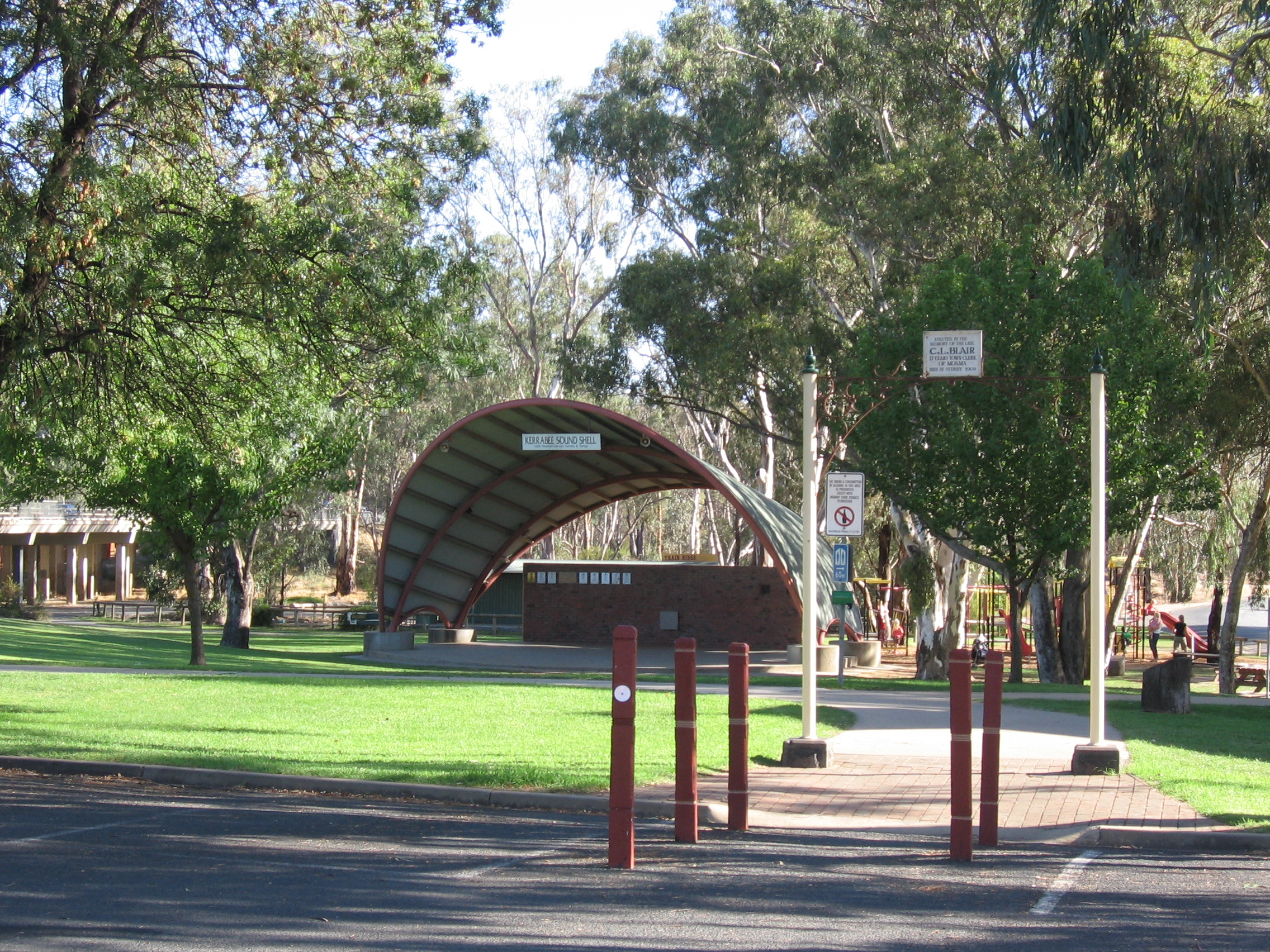
The sound shell on the river foreshore at Moama

Moama currently has a permanent population of about 3,700, although this swells significantly during holiday periods and the Southern 80 Water Ski race, held in February.

The town has its own New South Wales state primary school, Moama Public School, an Anglican secondary college, "Moama Anglican Grammar School". It also has five full-time New South Wales Police Officers stationed at Moama Police Station adjacent to the Moama Court House on Francis Street; a New South Wales Rural Fire Service Station on Perricoota Road staffed by Volunteer Fire Fighters, a New South Wales Fire Brigade Station staffed by retained NSWFB personnel and a New South Wales State Emergency Service situated in the Moama Industrial area. Ambulance services are provided by Ambulance Victoria, stationed in Echuca. The Transport for NSW are situated on Meninya Street, opposite the former Bank of New South Wales and adjacent to the Moama Sound Shell and the recently constructed War Memorial. NSW Maritime moved to a modern premises on the Cobb Highway in Moama's Industrial Estate in 2010.

The town has recently undergone a massive resurgence in people moving from Melbourne seeking a "tree change". The Murray Shire Council has approved new developments in retail, sporting and residential sub divisions. Located just outside Moama is the "Heartland" Speedway.

A new $7.9 million Moama Police Station was officially opened on 1 April 2026, replacing the ageing Maiden Street station that had been in use for over 30 years and dated back close to a century. The project represents a significant upgrade in policing infrastructure for the Murray River Police District, delivering a modern, purpose-built facility designed to support the needs of a growing regional population. The official opening was attended by Minister for Police and Counter-terrorism Yasmin Catley, NSW Police Commissioner Mal Lanyon, Member for Murray Helen Dalton MP, Acting Assistant Commissioner Darren Brand APM, and Murray River Police District Commander Superintendent Paul Smith APM.

The new station functions as a central policing hub and includes a wide range of upgraded facilities, such as a public front counter, custody area with van dock, general duties and duty rooms, detectives’ offices and task force room, command and administrative offices, and Traffic and Highway Patrol offices. It also features state-of-the-art CCTV and internal and external security systems, along with storage areas, off-street parking for police vehicles, and improved staff amenities, including a meal room and lockers. Designed to enhance operational capability, the station can accommodate general duties officers as well as specialist resources when required, including detectives, domestic violence officers, and police prosecutors. Construction began in 2025, and the facility became operational in January 2026 prior to its official opening.

The development aims to strengthen frontline policing, improve emergency response and crime prevention capabilities, and provide better support for both officers and the local community as the Moama region continues to grow.

== Murray River border ==
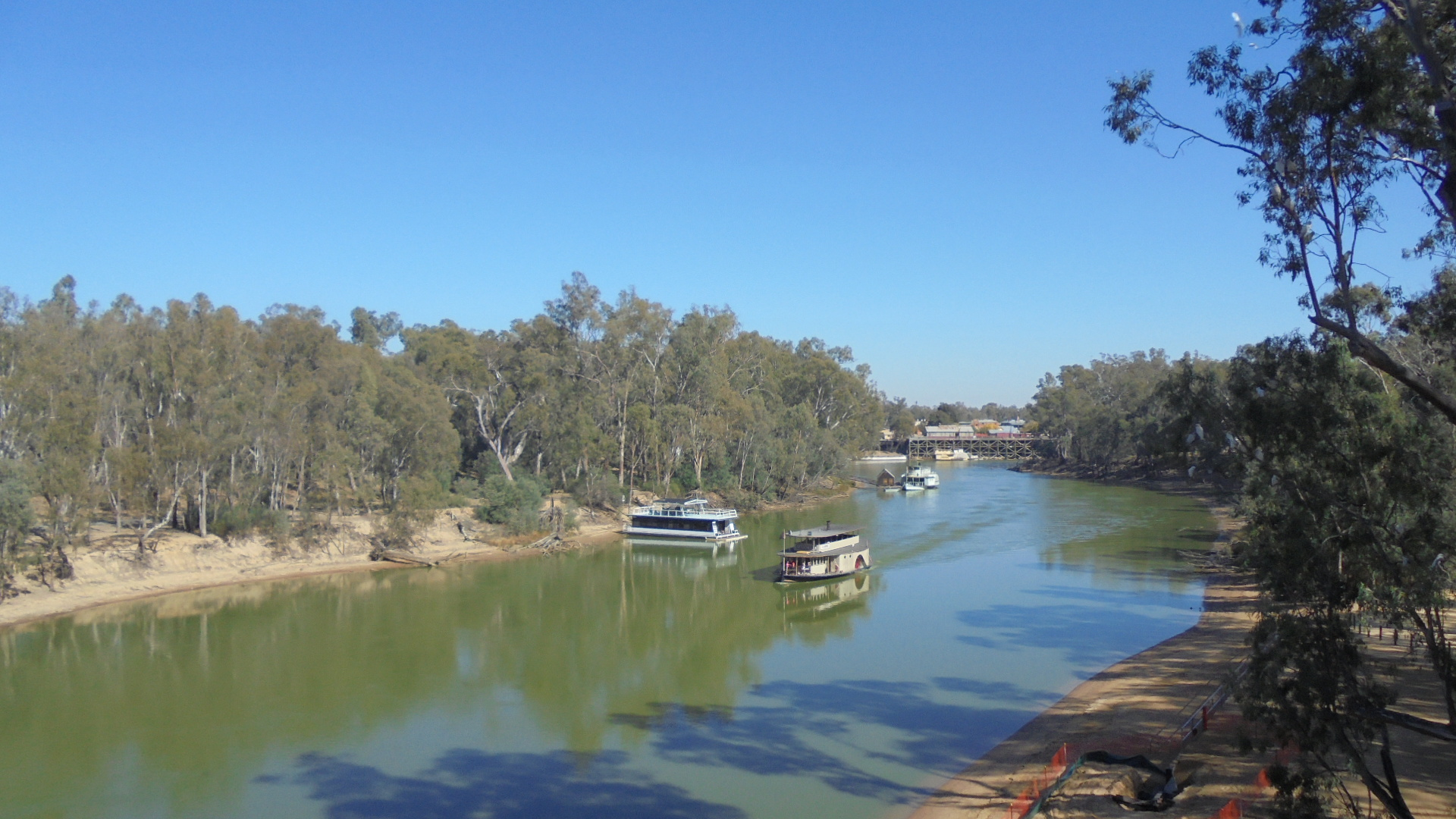
Paddle Steamer on Murray River at Moama

The State of New South Wales takes in the Murray River up to the top of the riverbank on the Victorian side. The NSW Waterways Authority is a self-funding regulatory authority to ensure the safe and environmentally responsible use of NSW waterways including the Murray by all boat operators. New South Wales Police Force members attached to the Moama Police Station also patrol the Murray River in NSW Police Launch "Moama".

== Tourism ==
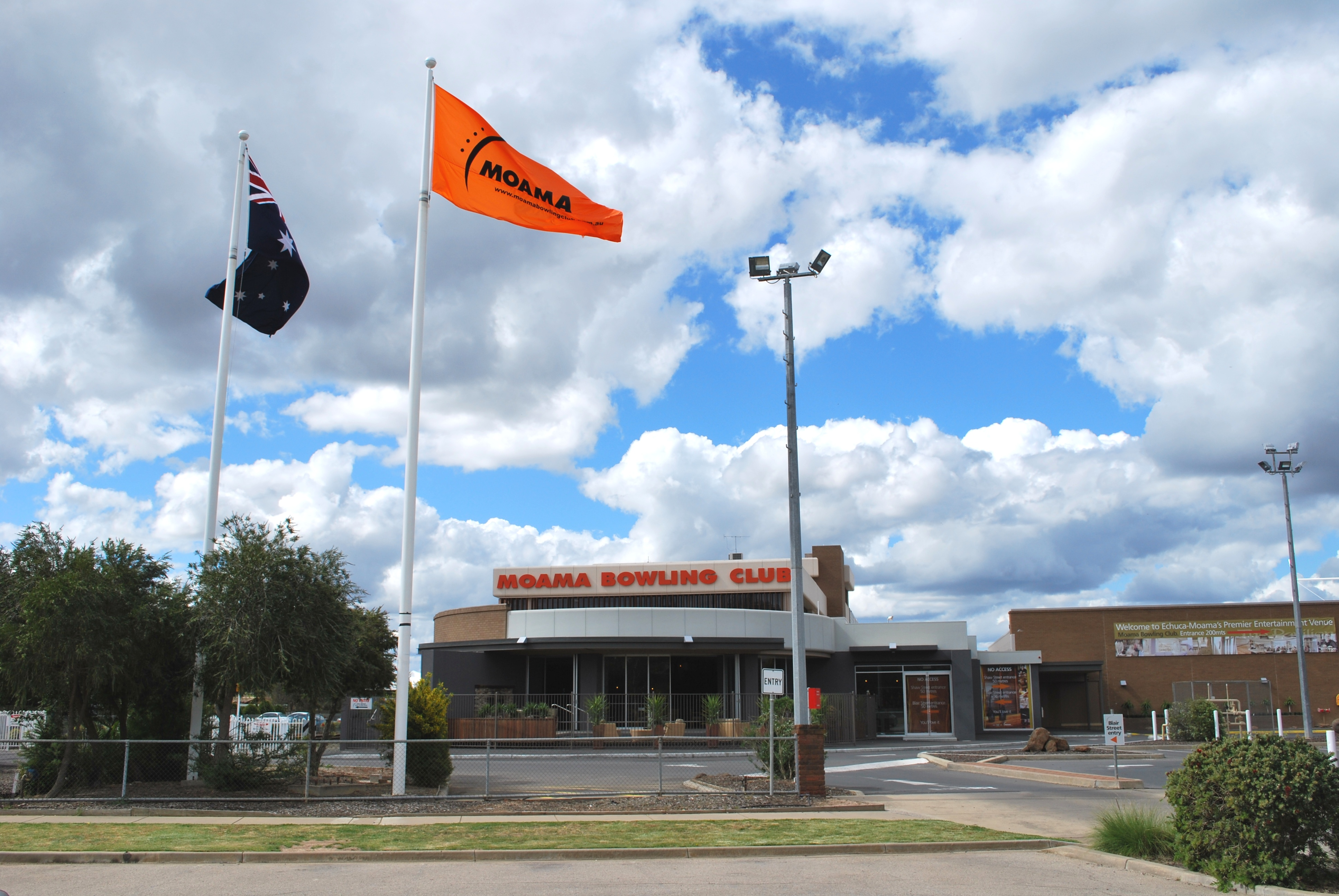
The large Moama Bowls Club

During the 1980s Moama received thousands of visitors each week from Melbourne, due to New South Wales' more liberal gambling laws and the presence of poker machines in some of Moama's entertainment venues. The legalisation of poker machines in Victoria killed off these day tours, although poker machines are still a significant tourist drawing card in the town.

Moama is also home to the Rich River Golf Club, an international-standard 36-hole golf course, and the Moama Bowling Club (lawn bowls). Both venues have hosted significant national tournaments and competitions. The town also possesses a moderately large number of hotels, caravan parks, resorts, rented houseboats and wineries.

A significant fire occurred at the Moama Bowling Club in June 2008, with an estimated damage bill of $3 million AUS.

== Notable people of Moama ==
- Isaiah Firebrace (winner of the eighth season of The X Factor Australia & 2017 Eurovision entrant) was born in 1999 and grew up in Moama.
- Danny Lolicato (Young Engineer NSW 2017) was born in Moama in 1991.
- James Rogers, who served in South Africa during the Boer War and was awarded the Victoria Cross, was born in Moama in 1875.
- Mary Jeanette Robison known professionally as May Robson, the American-based actress whose career spanned 59 years from 1883 to 1942, was born in Moama in 1858.
- Lachie Schultz, Australian rules footballer
- Jobe Shanahan, Australian rules footballer
- Todd Murphy, Australian international cricketer, was born in 2000.

== See also ==
- Moama Football Club
