= Mal McGillivray =

Australian rules footballer

Personal information
- Full name: Malcolm Donald McGillivray
- Nickname: Dick
- Born: 28 August 1929; Echuca, Victoria
- Died: 7 November 1984 (aged 55); Gunbower, Victoria
- Original team: Gunbower
- Height: 185 cm (6 ft 1 in)
- Weight: 89 kg (196 lb)
- Positions: Follower, defender

Playing career^{1}
Years	Club	Games (Goals)
1950	Essendon	1 (0)
- ^{1} Playing statistics correct to the end of 1950.

Malcolm Donald McGillivray (28 August 1929 – 7 November 1984) was an Australian rules footballer who played with Essendon in the Victorian Football League (VFL). He won a reserves premiership in his only season with Essendon. McGillivray the played for Echuca for three years before returning to his original club, Gunbower, as captain-coach in 1954. He won a premiership in his first season back with Gunbower and played with them until retiring in 1963.

McGillivray worked as a grazier.
