= Brian Lord =

Australian singer

Brian Lord (born 1965) is an Australian country music artist located in Echuca, Australia. He has been a lead vocalist/guitarist for Bendigo-formed bands Total Kaos (1987), No Mercy (1987–1992, relocated to Melbourne), BJ & the Fatties (1992–1993, relocated to Echuca). In Echuca, he formed the Brian Lord Party Band in 1996, changed later to The Party Band , which mainly performed as a Duo/Trio (Male/Male or Male/Female) with various members, including country music artist and 1986 Tamworth Star Maker Winner, Jane Maddick for a short time. The Party Band was also known as a Solo act, with backing music.

1996 saw Brian release his first independent album titled "The Brian Lord Band", which included two original tracks, "Just A Boy From The Country" (written by Brian) and "Fantasy Waltz" (written by Brian Lord & Les Tracey, NSW), and twelve popular cover songs from the country and country rock genres. Apart from local "live" gig requests this release did not make many waves and forced him to refocus on his love of country music.

In 2000 with new manager Maree Spinkle, Brian became the oldest entrant, at 35 years of age, to become a finalist at the prestigious Tamworth Star Maker Awards to be held in January 2001, which was eventually won by Grant Richardson. This helped boost his career profile in the Australian country music scene.

By mid-2001, Brian had independently released two singles into the Australian Country Music Charts - "My Bare Hands" (written by Greg Macainish of Skyhoooks fame) pre-released on NfS 67 and "Love Had The Last Word" (A duet with Kayleen Newton, QLD and written by Alan Wagstaff, NZ) pre-released on NfS 68. These two singles garnered a few nominations being a top 5 finalist in the Male Vocal, Heritage Song and Open Section - Duo divisions at the 2002 Victorian Country Music Awards held in conjunction with the Whittlesea Country Music Festival. Brian & Kaylene performed their duet at these awards.

2002 saw Brian release his third independent single into the Australian Country Music Charts - "Finders Keepers" (written by Paul Miller, VIC and Ruth "Teena" Eaton, USA). This track was added to his mid-2001 release of "My Bare Hands/Love Had The Last Word" as a third track and had limited availability.

Although Brian continues songwriting and home-recording along with his long-term passion of teaching music, where he teaches singing and guitar students of all levels, his live performances are presently limited due to time spent training as an electrical engineer. His other passions, marketing (both on and offline) and breeding and showing Australian cattle dogs have also presently taken a back seat.

Brian is married to Kim, (née Stockton) who was an Australian amateur women's boxing champion and undefeated professional women boxer (now retired). They have 3 adult children.
