= Melissa Schilling =

American academic

- Citizenship: United States
- Education: University of Washington, University of Colorado, Boulder
- Children: 2
- Awards: National Science Foundation CAREER Grant
- Scientific career
- Fields: Technological Innovation; Strategy; Management and Organization
- Workplaces: New York University Stern School of Business
- Website: www.melissaaschilling.com

Melissa A. Schilling is an American professor and innovation scholar. She holds the John Herzog Family chair in management and organizations at NYU Stern, and is also Innovation Director for NYU Stern's Fubon Center for Technology, Business and Innovation.

She is also the author of Strategic Management of Technological Innovation (in its 7th edition), and is coauthor of Strategic Management: Theory and Cases (in its 14th edition).

She is also author of Quirky: The Remarkable Story of the Traits, Foibles, and Genius of Breakthrough Innovators Who Changed the World.

She and her work have been featured in NPR's Marketplace, The Wall Street Journal, Bloomberg BusinessWeek, Entrepreneur, Inc., Financial Times, Harvard Business Review, Huffington Post, CNBC, Scientific American, and USA Today, among others.

She also speaks regularly at national and international conferences as well as at corporations on strategy and innovation.

== Biography ==
Melissa Schilling earned her PhD in strategic management from the University of Washington. Her research focuses on innovation and strategy in high technology industries such as smartphones, video games, pharmaceuticals, biotechnology, electric vehicles, and renewable energies. Much of her work has focused on technology trajectories, collaboration networks and modularity. Her interest in medical innovation also led her to study neurodegenerative diseases, and she has published an influential article on the relationship between Alzheimer's and diabetes.

Professor Schilling has won numerous awards such as the 2003 National Science Foundation's CAREER Award, the Sumantra Ghoshal Award for Rigour and Relevance in the Study of Management, and the Best Paper in Management Science and Organization Science for 2007. She has served on the National Academy of Sciences Committee on "Overcoming the Barriers to Adoption of Electric Vehicles," and currently serves on the Advisory Board of the American Antitrust Institute.

Professor Schilling has advised numerous companies including Bloomberg Corporation, IBM, Siemens, Masco Coatings, and others, and currently serves on the advisory boards of Zeta Energy and Soteria Market.

== Selected publications ==
- Schilling, M.A. 2000. "Towards a general modular systems theory and its application to inter-firm product modularity". Academy of Management Review, vol. 25:312-334.
- Schilling, M.A., & C. Phelps. 2007. "Interfirm collaboration networks: The impact of large-scale network structure on firm innovation", Management Science, 53: 1113-1126.
- Schilling, M.A., & M. Esmundo. 2009. "Technology s-curves in renewable energy alternatives: Analysis and implications for industry and government". Energy Policy, 37:1767-1781.
- Schilling, M.A. 2015. "Technology shocks, technological collaboration, and innovation outcomes". Organization Science, 26:668-686.
- Schilling, M.A. 2015. Strategic Management of Technological Innovation, 5th edition. Boston: McGraw Hill. In English, Spanish, Korean, Chinese (long form and short form), Italian, and Greek.
- Schilling, M.A. 2018. Quirky: The Remarkable Story of the Traits, Foibles, and Genius of Breakthrough Innovators who Changed the World. New York: Public Affairs.
- Rietveld, J & Schilling, MA. 2021. "Platform competition: A systematic and interdisciplinary review of the literature." Journal of Management, 47:1528-1563.
- Kretschmer, T, Leiponen, A, Schilling, M & Vasudeva, G. 2022. "Platform ecosystems as metaorganizations: Implications for platform strategies." Strategic Management Journal, 43: 405-424.
