= Gordon Geddes =

Australian rules footballer

Personal information
- Full name: Gordon Nesbit Geddes
- Born: 8 July 1922; Echuca, Victoria
- Died: 5 July 1982 (aged 59); Caulfield South, Victoria
- Original team: Army
- Height: 175 cm (5 ft 9 in)
- Weight: 73 kg (161 lb)

Playing career^{1}
Years	Club	Games (Goals)
1944–45	St Kilda	20 (0)
- ^{1} Playing statistics correct to the end of 1945.

Gordon Nesbit Geddes (8 July 1922 – 5 July 1982) was an Australian rules footballer who played with St Kilda in the Victorian Football League (VFL).
