= George Williams (Australian footballer) =

Australian rules footballer

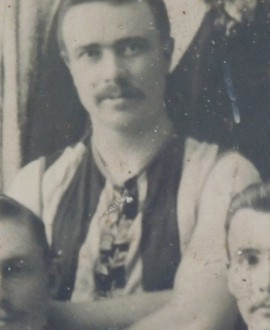
- Williams in 1901

Personal information
- Full name: George Richard Williams
- Born: 30 April 1871; Echuca, Victoria
- Died: 27 April 1937 (aged 65); Melbourne, Victoria
- Original team: Carlton (VFA)
- Height: 178 cm (5 ft 10 in)
- Weight: 80 kg (176 lb)

Playing career^{1}
Years	Club	Games (Goals)
1897–01	Collingwood	55 (0)
- ^{1} Playing statistics correct to the end of 1901.

George Williams (30 April 1871 – 27 April 1937) was an Australian rules footballer who played with Collingwood in the Victorian Football League (VFL).
