= Tommy Carr (Australian footballer) =

Australian rules footballer

Personal information
- Full name: Thomas Carr
- Born: 15 April 1882; Echuca, Victoria
- Died: 17 May 1963 (aged 81); Echuca, Victoria
- Original team: St Ignatius

Playing career^{1}
Years	Club	Games (Goals)
1901	St Kilda	5 (0)
- ^{1} Playing statistics correct to the end of 1901.

Tommy Carr (15 April 1882 – 17 May 1963) was an Australian rules footballer who played with St Kilda in the Victorian Football League (VFL).
