= John Quirke =

John Quirke may refer to:

- John Quirke (politician)
- John Quirke (rugby union)
- Johnny Quirke, Irish hurler

== See also ==
- John Quirk (disambiguation)
