= Bert Cowley =

Australian rules footballer

Personal information
- Full name: Albert John Langworthy Cowley
- Born: 8 February 1886; Echuca, Victoria
- Died: 9 June 1962 (aged 76); South Melbourne, Victoria
- Original team: Echuca (GVFL)

Playing career^{1}
Years	Club	Games (Goals)
1911	Carlton	2 (0)
- ^{1} Playing statistics correct to the end of 1911.

Albert John Langworthy Cowley (8 February 1886 – 9 June 1962) was an Australian rules footballer who played for the Carlton Football Club in the Victorian Football League (VFL).
