= Jack Graham (Australian footballer, born 1878) =

Australian rules footballer

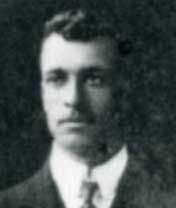

Personal information
- Full name: John Thomas Graham
- Born: 2 March 1878; Echuca, Victoria
- Died: 22 January 1907 (aged 28); Ararat, Victoria
- Original team: Scotch College

Playing career^{1}
Years	Club	Games (Goals)
1897–99	Melbourne	8 (1)
- ^{1} Playing statistics correct to the end of 1899.

John Thomas Graham (2 March 1878 – 22 January 1907) was an Australian rules footballer who played with Melbourne in the Victorian Football League (VFL).
