= Bill Kyme =

Australian rules footballer

Personal information
- Full name: William Herbert Kyme
- Born: 4 December 1891; Echuca, Victoria
- Died: 19 November 1975 (aged 83); Heidelberg, Victoria
- Original team: Echuca

Playing career^{1}
Years	Club	Games (Goals)
1912	Essendon	3 (2)
- ^{1} Playing statistics correct to the end of 1912.

William Herbert Kyme (4 December 1891 – 19 November 1975) was an Australian rules footballer who played with Essendon in the Victorian Football League (VFL).
