= Quirke =

Quirke may refer to:

== People ==
- Alan Quirke (born 1976), Irish Gaelic footballer
- Antonia Quirke, British film critic
- Dave Quirke (born 1947), Irish former professional football (soccer) player
- John Quirke (politician) (born 1950), South Australian parliamentarian
- Johnny Quirke (1911–1983), Irish hurler
- Kieron Quirke, English writer
- Micheál Quirke (born 1980), Irish Gaelic footballer
- Michael Quirke (born 1991), English footballer
- Pauline Quirke (born 1959), English actress
- Percy Quirke (1898–1972), Australian politician
- Stephen Quirke, British Egyptologist
- William Quirke (c. 1896–1955), Irish politician

== Others ==
- Quirke (series), a series of crime novels by Benjamin Black
- Quirke (TV series), a British/Irish television series on BBC One and RTÉ One in 2014 based on the novels
- Quirke Mine

== See also ==
- Quirk (disambiguation)
