= Bill Talbot =

Australian rules footballer

Personal information
- Full name: William Edward Talbot
- Born: 18 March 1895; Echuca, Victoria
- Died: 2 January 1983 (aged 87); Victoria Park, Western Australia
- Original team: East Fremantle

Playing career^{1}
Years	Club	Games (Goals)
1918	South Melbourne	2 (0)
1919	St Kilda	6 (3)
Total		8 (3)
- ^{1} Playing statistics correct to the end of 1919.

William Edward Talbot (18 March 1895 – 2 January 1983) was an Australian rules footballer who played with South Melbourne and St Kilda in the Victorian Football League (VFL).
