= John Quirk =

John Quirk may refer to:

- John Quirk (bishop) (1849–1924), Anglican bishop
- John Quirk (politician) (1870–1938), Australian politician
- John Quirk (footballer) (born 1945), Australian rules footballer
- John F. Quirk (1859 – 1922), American Jesuit educator

== See also ==
- John Quirke (disambiguation)
