= Dick Robertson (footballer) =

Australian rules footballer

Personal information
- Full name: Richard Thomas Robertson
- Nickname: Rubber
- Born: 24 May 1877; Echuca, Victoria
- Died: 9 May 1936 (aged 58); Penshurst, Victoria
- Original team: Beverley
- Height: 168 cm (5 ft 6 in)

Playing career^{1}
| Years | Club | Games (Goals) |
| 1898 | Melbourne | 5 (0) |
| 1899 | St Kilda | 1 (0) |
| Total | | 6 (0) |
- ^{1} Playing statistics correct to the end of 1899.

Richard Robertson (24 May 1877 – 9 May 1936) was an Australian rules footballer who played with Melbourne and St Kilda in the Victorian Football League (VFL).
