= John Quirk (footballer) =

Australian rules footballer

Personal information
- Full name: John Anthony Quirk
- Born: 28 July 1945 (age 81)
- Original team: St Kilda CBC
- Height: 175 cm (5 ft 9 in)
- Weight: 70 kg (154 lb)
- Position: Rover

Playing career^{1}
Years	Club	Games (Goals)
1966	Melbourne	3 (2)
- ^{1} Playing statistics correct to the end of 1966.

Career highlights
- 3 Brownlow Votes

John Quirk (born 28 July 1945) is a former Australian rules footballer who played with Melbourne in the Victorian Football League (VFL).

After playing with Melbourne, Quirk played with Port Melbourne and then Box Hill in the Victorian Football Association.

After retiring from football, John went on to have 3 children; Damien, Sebastian and Felicity. He has 4 grandchildren; Arabella, William, Harry and Willow.

John then went on and lived in the Hunter Valley, where he became a CEO at a winery. He then moved to Echuca to be closer to his family.
