= The Quirk =

The Quirk was a for-charity literary magazine which publishes work from poets and artists across the world. It printed work from a wide array of writers, including W.D. Snodgrass, Yusef Komunyakaa, Robert Bly, Naomi Shihab Nye, Alberto Rios, Dorianne Laux, Daisy Fried, Diane di Prima, Jim Daniels, Alicia Ostriker, and many others. The magazine was founded in 2005 by Kaveh Akbar when he was a high school student. He was also the editor, as a local general interest magazine. After thirteen issues, The Quirk premiered its first literary issue.

The magazine donated over $3,000 to good causes around the world, including UNICEF and the Keep A Child Alive AIDS fund.
