= Ed Quirk =

Ed Quirk may refer to:

- Ed Quirk (American football) (1925–1962), American football fullback
- Ed Quirk (rugby union) (born 1991), Australian rugby union footballer
