= Quirky (book) =

Book by Melissa Schilling

- Author: Melissa Schilling
- Language: English
- Subject: Business; economics; leadership
- Publisher: PublicAffairs
- Publication date: 2018
- Pages: 336
- ISBN: 978-1-61039-792-6

Quirky: The Remarkable Story of the Traits, Foibles, and Genius of Breakthrough Innovators Who Changed the World is a 2018 book by Melissa Schilling, a professor at New York University Stern School of Business. The book was published by PublicAffairs, a division of Hachette Book Group.

== Content ==
Melissa Schilling develops cases studies of eight serial breakthrough innovators – Elon Musk, Dean Kamen, Steve Jobs, Marie Curie, Albert Einstein, Thomas Edison, Benjamin Franklin, and Nikola Tesla – to identify commonalities in their capabilities, motives, personalities, and experiences. These characteristics are then integrated with the research on innovation and creativity to show how they might influence breakthrough idea generation and extreme persistence.

== Reception ==
The Financial Times reviewer wrote,

Quirky is a business book that lives up to its title. In part, Melissa Schilling has produced an entertaining and enlightening romp through the lives of eight "breakthrough innovators", exploring their remarkable abilities, personalities and motives ... The author deftly draws out some of the other quirky characteristics that these innovators shared. Perhaps the most significant was that, with the notable exception of Benjamin Franklin, they all had a sense of separateness, which created the space for original thinking ... The more intriguing point, with which Ms Schilling concludes, is that breakthrough innovation in science does not always come from people who have pursued a "typical" scientific path. That makes it all the more imperative to broaden educational opportunities, allow non-scientists to access scientific resources and expertise, and give free rein to the quirky.

Joe Culley at The Irish Times writes, "Schilling's prose is clear and largely jargon-free, and the individual profiles are excellent."

A reviewer in Strategy + Business writes,

The approach Schilling takes with Quirky is a variant of the case study method – instead of companies, the cases here are the lives of great inventors. She examines their lives to uncover the common personality traits and "foibles" that helped them see what others did not ...

Schilling has a nice eye for the telling detail, and shares the stories of these well-known innovators' lives with economy and precision. ...

Much of this model seems intuitively correct. But Schilling's sample size is so small that it's hard to know if the conclusions she draws from that sample about the nature of serial innovation would hold up to closer scrutiny ...

In fact, the real paradox of Schilling's work is that even though it looks at completely extraordinary people, it may be most valuable for what it tells us about how organizations can harness the innovative power of ordinary people.

In Innovation & Tech Today, Charles Warner writes,

In Quirky, Dr. Schilling studies the minds, characteristics, innovations, and learning processes of eight women and men who represent cornerstones in American and global innovation over the past 250 years: Albert Einstein, Elon Musk, Nikola Tesla, Benjamin Franklin, Thomas Edison, Marie Curie, Steve Jobs, and Dean Kamen. In so doing, she opens up the larger relationship between innovation and genius, while also pointing out some of the challenges in society and education today that might impact our future innovators.

Stephanie Orellana writes,

Quirky is an entertaining read, and not only because it summarizes biographical information about several very interesting people and includes anecdotes about their own thoughts on their work and lives. The book also offers insights into aspects of these innovators' characters, personalities, and working styles that reveal both opportunities and challenges for those of us seeking to improve our innovation capacity.

A reviewer in the International Journal of Innovation Management writes,

It's a bold and impressive book with some challenging ideas about how we might learn from these people despite their being different. Well-researched and rigorous in approach the book draws on a wealth of material so that each biographical sketch gives us a rounded view of the people involved. As mini-biographies they are fascinating – not to say sometimes a little disturbing.
