= Quark (hash function) =

Cryptographic hash function

Quark is a cryptographic hash function (family). It was designed by Jean-Philippe Aumasson, Luca Henzen, Willi Meier and María Naya-Plasencia.

Quark was created because of the expressed need by application designers (notably for implementing RFID protocols) for a lightweight cryptographic hash function. The SHA-3 NIST hash function competition concerned general-purpose designs and focused on software performance.

Quark is a lightweight hash function, based on a single security level and on the sponge construction, to minimize memory requirements. Inspired by the lightweight ciphers Grain and KATAN, the hash function family Quark is composed of three instances u-Quark, d-Quark, and t-Quark. Hardware benchmarks show that Quark compares well to previous lightweight hashes.

For example, the u-Quark instance conjecturally provides at least 64-bit security against all attacks (collisions, multicollisions, distinguishers, etc.), fits in 1379 gate-equivalents, and consumes on average 2.44 μW at 100 kHz in 0.18 μm ASIC.
