= Echuca =

- Town
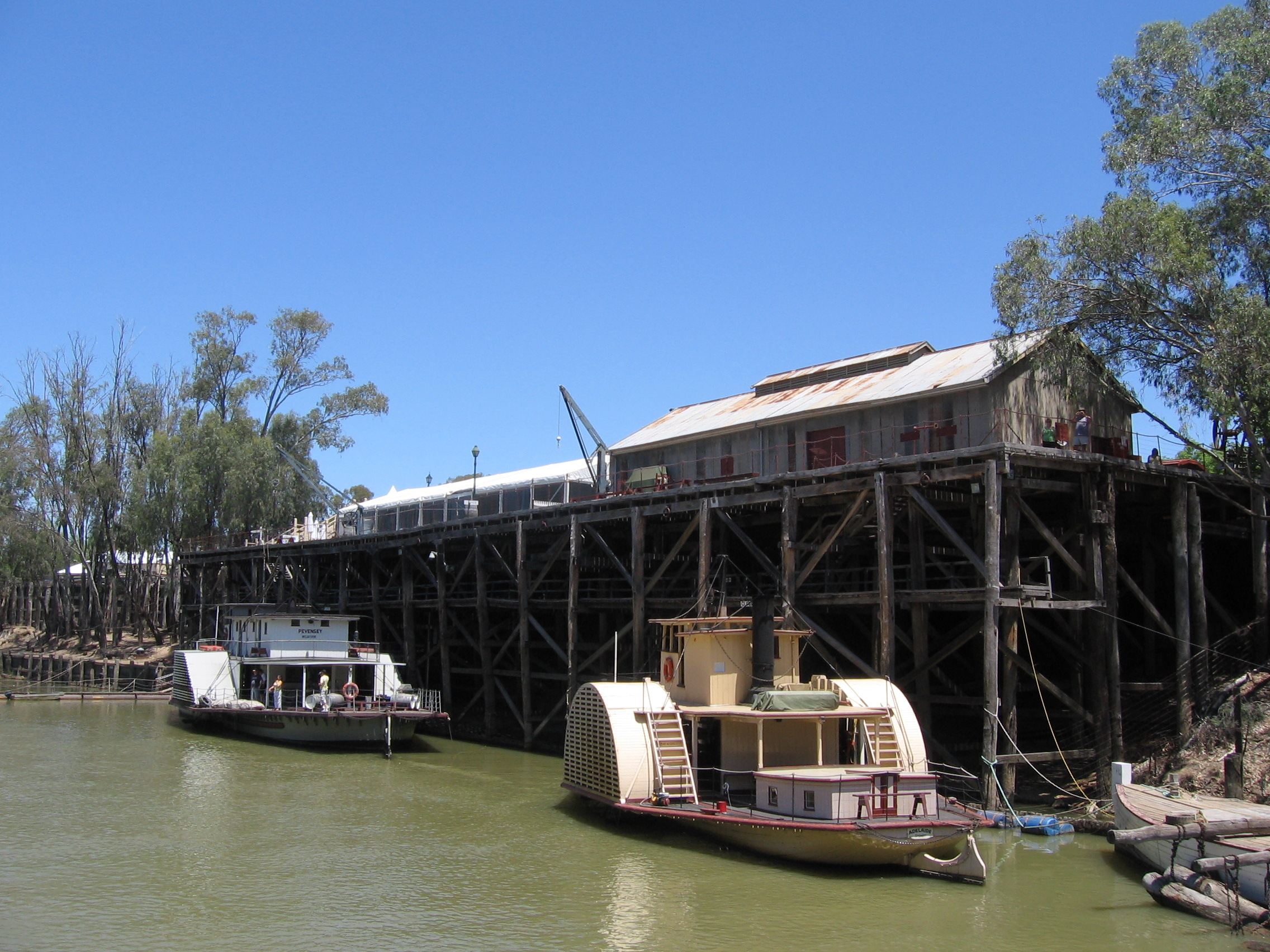
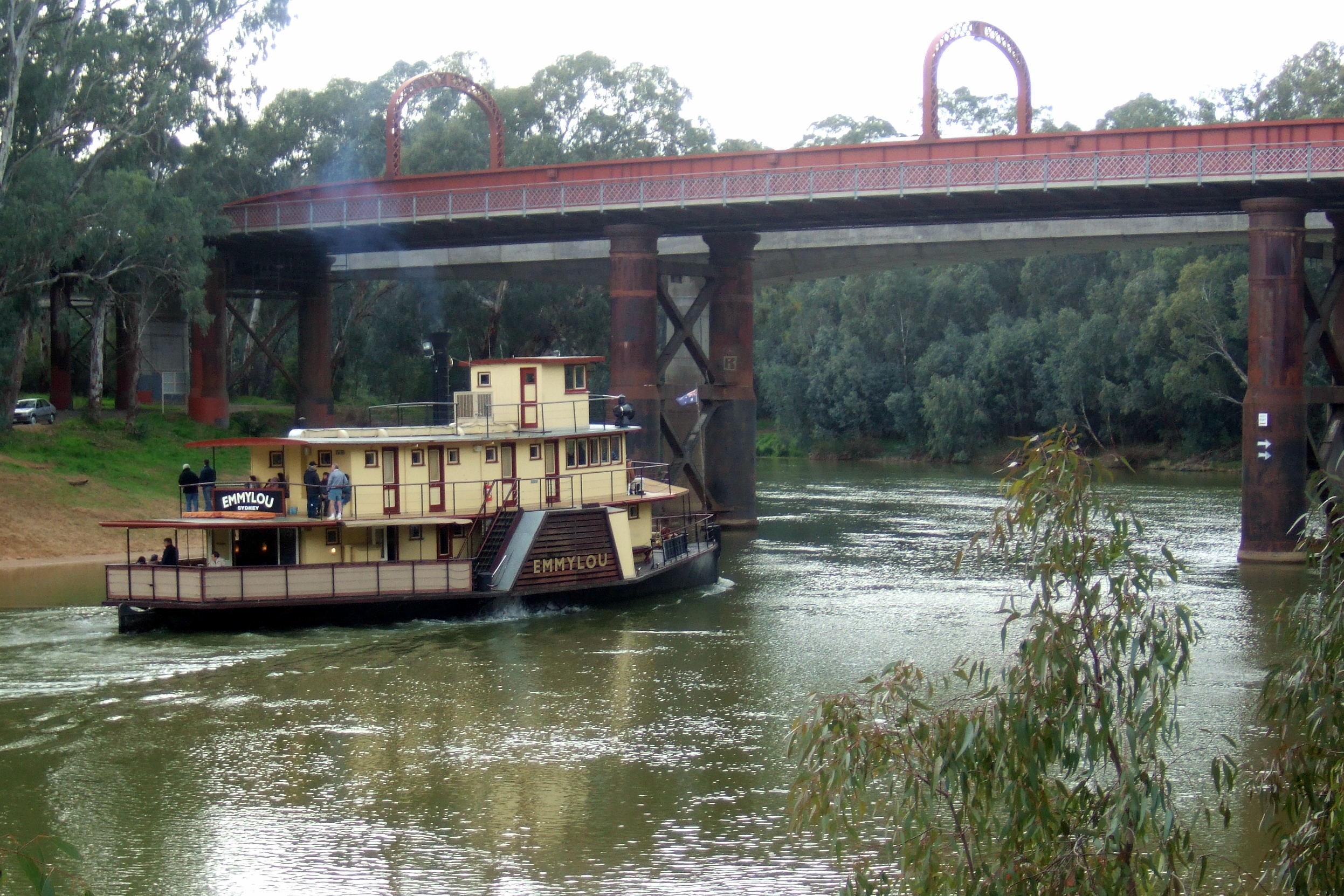
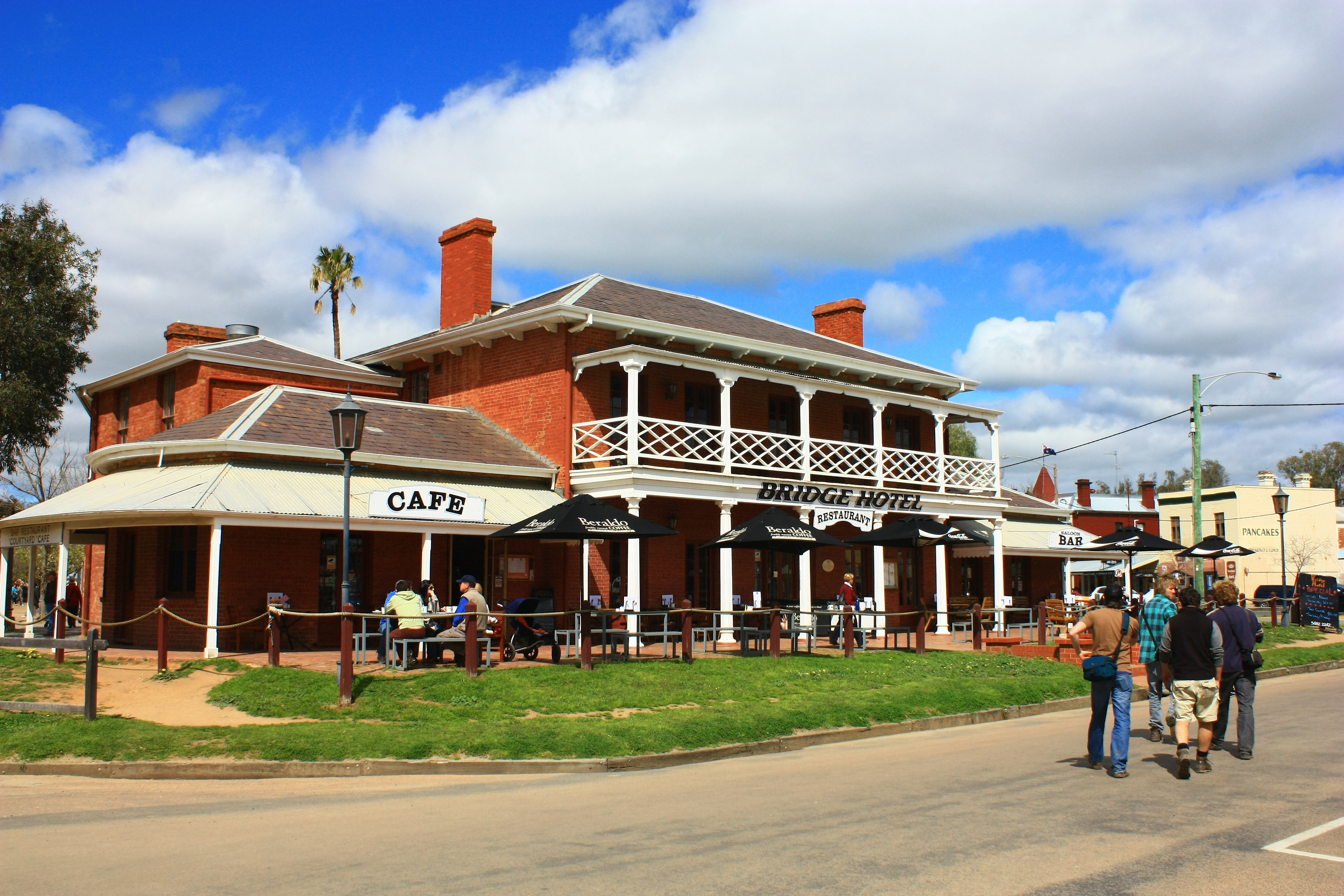
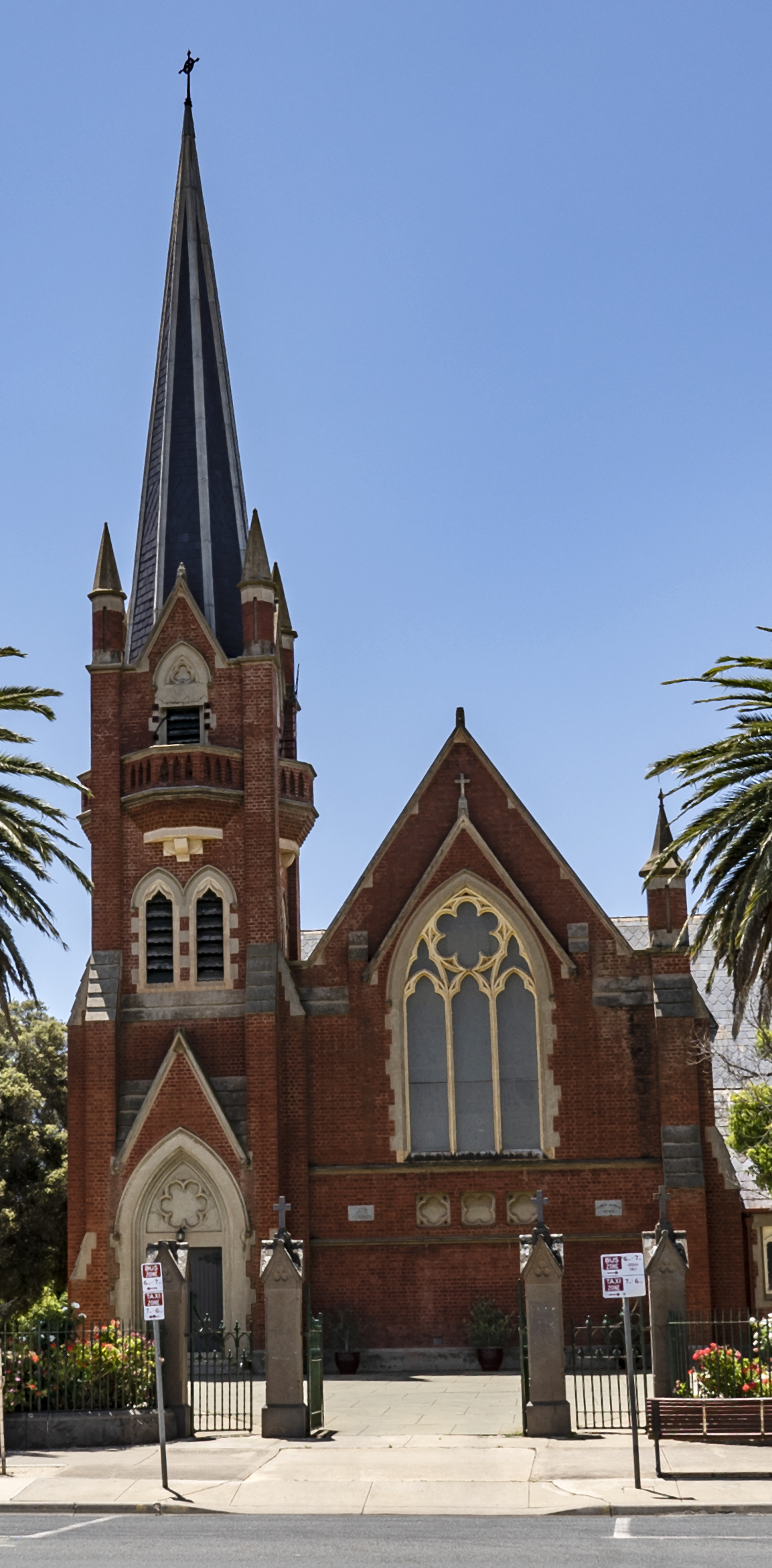

- Interactive map of Echuca
- Coordinates: 36°08′0″S 144°45′0″E
- Country: Australia
- State: Victoria
- LGA: Shire of Campaspe
- Location: 214 km (133 mi) N of Melbourne; 91 km (57 mi) NE of Bendigo; 76 km (47 mi) NW of Shepparton; 3 km (1.9 mi) S of Moama

Government
  - State electorate: Murray Plains
  - Federal division: Nicholls

Area
  - Total: 140.1 km^{2} (54.1 sq mi)
- Elevation: 96 m (315 ft)

Population
  - Total: 15,056 (2021 census)
  - Density: 107.47/km^{2} (278.34/sq mi)
- Time zone: UTC+10 (AEST)
  - Summer (DST): UTC+11 (AEDT)
- Postcode: 3564
- County: Rodney
- Mean max temp: 22.2 °C (72.0 °F)
- Mean min temp: 9.3 °C (48.7 °F)
- Annual rainfall: 428.4 mm (16.87 in)
Localities around Echuca
Wharparilla	Moama
Echuca West	Echuca	Echuca Village
Bamawm	Strathallan	Koyuga

Echuca ( E-CHOO-ka) is a town on the banks of the Murray River and Campaspe River in Victoria, Australia. The border town of Moama is adjacent on the northern side of the Murray River in New South Wales. Echuca is the administrative centre and largest settlement in the Shire of Campaspe. As of the 2021 census, Echuca had a population of 15,056, and the population of the combined Echuca and Moama townships was 22,568.

Echuca lies within traditional Yorta Yorta country. The town's name is a Yorta Yorta word meaning "meeting of the waters". Echuca is close to the junction of the Goulburn, Campaspe, and Murray Rivers. Its position at the closest point of the Murray to Melbourne contributed to its development as a thriving river port city during the 19th century.

== History ==
=== Origins ===
The riverine plains of the Goulburn Broken catchment are the traditional lands of the Yorta Yorta nation. Their population before European contact is estimated to have been approximately 2400. The Yorta Yorta were dispossessed of their traditional lands and left to eke out an existence on the edges of European settlements as remnant tribal groups.

Present-day Echuca was founded by one of the most enterprising figures of the early colonial period, an ex-convict named Henry Hopwood. In 1850 he purchased a small punt to ferry people and goods across the Murray River near the Campaspe junction. The small settlement known as Hopwood's Ferry grew to become the town of Echuca. The Hopwood's Punt Post Office opened around 1854 and was renamed Echuca Post Office on 1 January 1855.

=== Australia's inland port ===
By the 1870s, Echuca had risen to prominence as Australia's largest inland port. Being the point of shortest distance between the Murray River and the major city of Melbourne, Echuca was both a key river port and railway junction. Paddle steamers would arrive at the 332-metre long redgum Echuca Wharf, were unloaded by hydraulic crane, and the goods then transported by rail to Melbourne. Wool, wheat, other grains, livestock, and timber were the most common commodities transported to Echuca. The wharf has been listed as a Heritage Place on the Australian National Heritage List.

This industrial boom led to a rapidly expanding population, from 26 inhabitants in 1854 to 4789 during the peak year of 1871. More than 80 pubs/hotels serviced the needs of the town, but it is rumoured that many more sly-grog shops, wine shanties, and beer houses, circumventing licensing laws existed in the area. An iron bridge was constructed over the Murray River in 1878 by the NSW Railways Department.

=== Decline ===
The expansion of the railways from Melbourne to most parts of Victoria, as well as improvements to roads and fickle river conditions all combined to lessen Echuca's importance, and by the 1890s the paddle steamer fleet was in decline. An economic depression and the collapse of several banks virtually ended Echuca's role as a major economic centre, and its population began to disperse.

== Population ==
As of the 2021 census, there were 15,056 people in Echuca.

- Aboriginal and Torres Strait Islander people made up 4.1% of the population.
- 85.3% of people were born in Australia. The next most common countries of birth were England 1.7% and New Zealand 1.1%.
- 89.4% of people spoke only English at home.
- The most common responses for religion were No Religion 42.7%, Catholic 21.8% and Anglican 12.4%.

== Governance ==
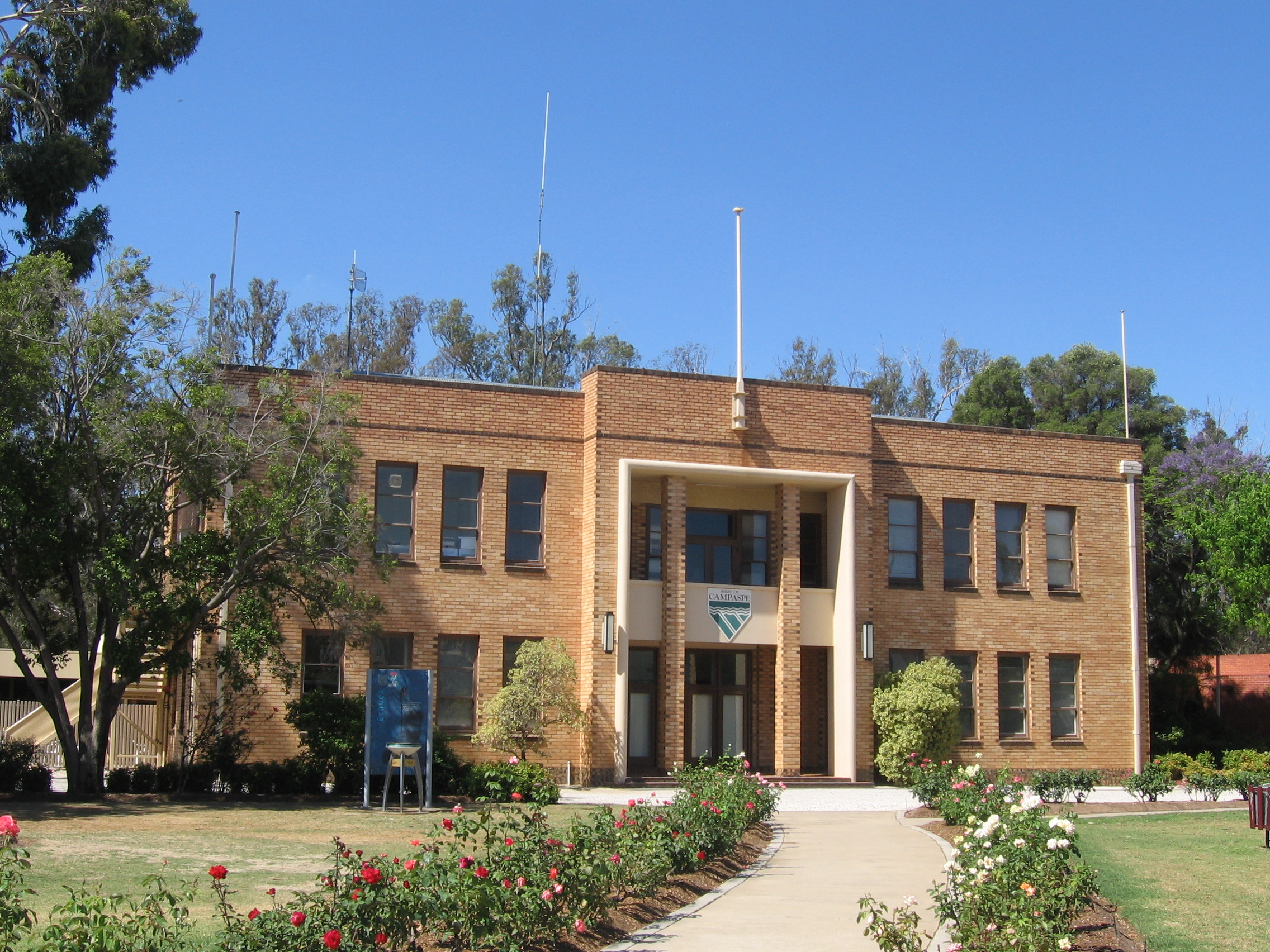
Campaspe Shire Council Building

Echuca is the administrative centre for the Campaspe Shire Council.

At the state level, Echuca is represented by the Electoral district of Murray Plains.

At the federal level, Echuca is represented by the Division of Nicholls.

== Economy, landmarks and retail ==
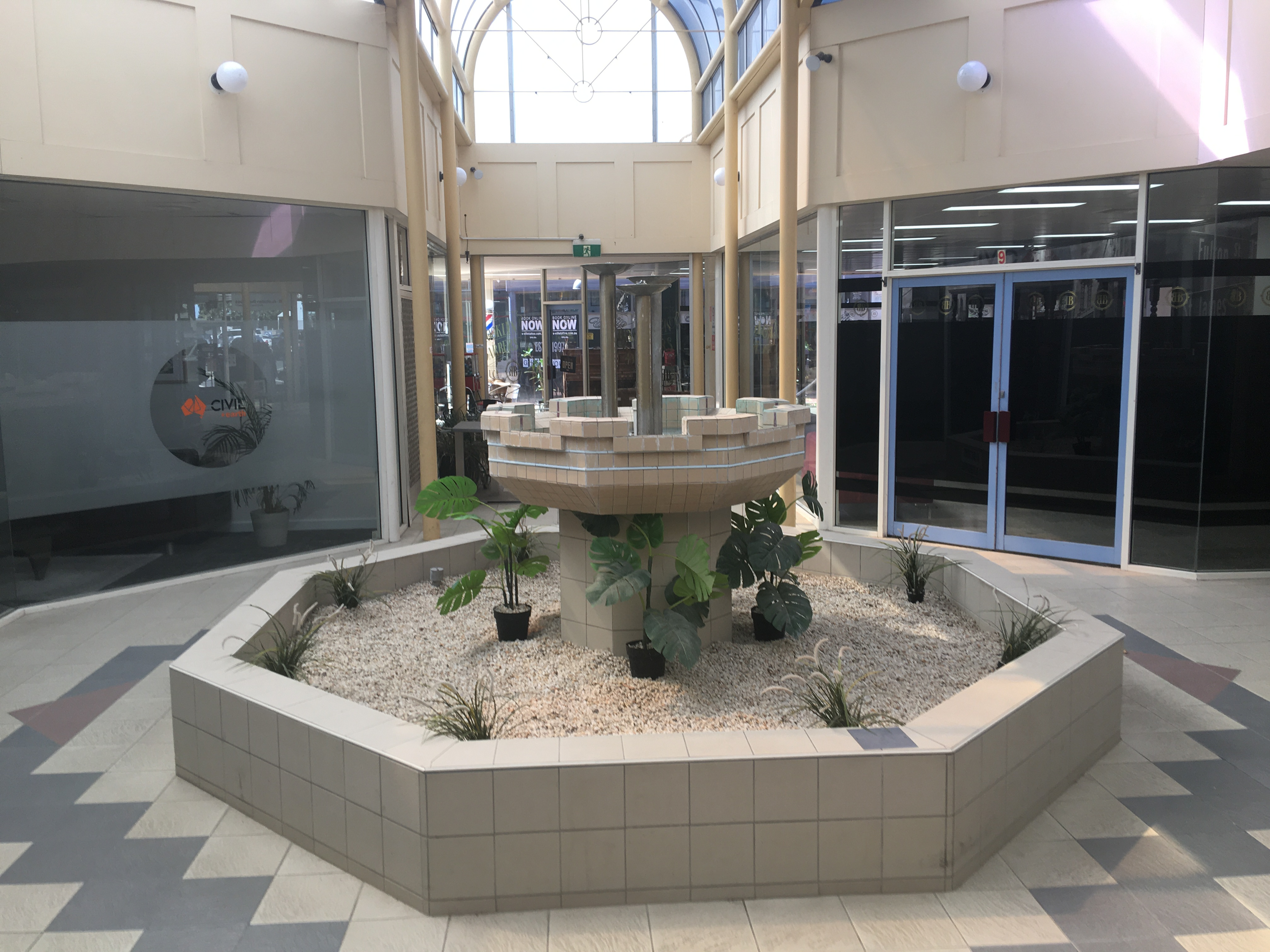
Inside the Fountain Plaza shopping arcade

The main industry in Echuca is tourism; it earns about $250 million a year for the Echuca economy. Visitors are attracted to the town by its climate, the Murray River and its paddle steamers, recreational attractions, several festivals and historical features, some of which have come to public awareness by the Nancy Cato novel All the Rivers Run, which was made into a TV miniseries.

Echuca is also a major regional service economy.

Agriculture is very important to the region. Dairy, wheat, sheep, pig, and cattle farms are all within close proximity.

== Culture ==
=== Paddle steamers ===
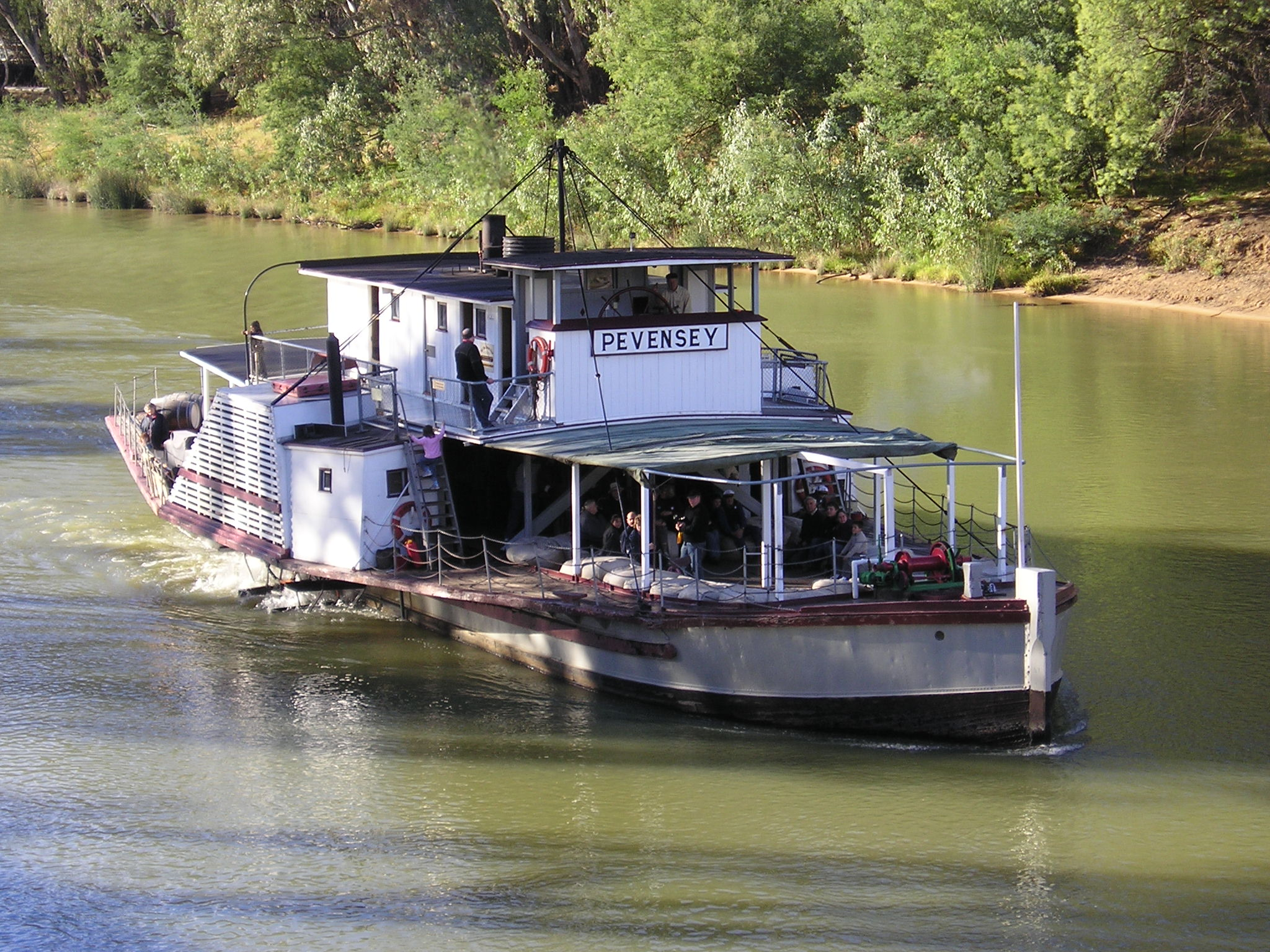
PS Pevensey

The port is home to the largest paddle steamer fleet in the world, which includes the world's oldest operating wooden hulled paddle steamer, PS Adelaide built in 1866. There are several historic vessels operating out of Echuca on a daily commercial basis, such as PS Pevensey (built 1911), PS Alexander Arbuthnot (built 1923), PS Adelaide (built 1866) operating from Echuca Wharf itself, PS Emmylou (built 1980 with a steam engine in use from 1906), PS Canberra (built 1913) and PV Pride of the Murray (built 1924 as a logging barge C24) operating from Riverboat Dock, a short distance downstream from the main wharf. These vessels conduct four to six 1-hour cruises daily, while Emmylou offers lunch, dinner, and scenic cruises. There are also a number of privately owned paddle steamers in Echuca, including PS Hero, PS Henry Charles, and the former Church of England mission steamer, PS Etona. As well as the paddle steamers there are numerous houseboats, many of which can be hired. MV Mary Ann (built 1981) operates as a cruising restaurant all year round.

The Port of Echuca is also restoring PS Success to full working order. When operational, it will be added to the fleet of paddle steamers at Echuca Wharf.

=== Events and festivals ===
Annual events held in Echuca include the Southern 80 waterski race, the largest waterski race in the world, (February), the Riverboats Music Festival (February), the Echuca-Moama Weddings Expo (May), the Echuca Rotary Steam, Horse and Vintage Rally (Queens Birthday weekend in June) and WinterBlues Festival (July).

=== In popular culture ===
In 1983, the Australian television mini-series, All the Rivers Run, based on a novel by Nancy Cato and starring Sigrid Thornton and John Waters, was filmed in and around Echuca. The local paddle steamers Pevensey and Emmylou featured in the mini-series as PS Philadelphia and PS Providence, respectively. The airing of this series around Australia and internationally revitalised Echuca's tourism economy.

In 1985, parts of the Australian telemovie My Brother Tom (based on the book by James Aldridge) were filmed in Echuca.

In the TV series Glitch, Vic, the district supervisor for the police forces of Echuca, the fictional Yoorana, and surrounding communities, is based in Echuca.

The ABC aired an episode of Get Krack!n on 6 February 2019 satirising morning television segments about regional food and wine tourism. There was some concern locally about how the episode depicted the town and its effect on tourism, although the intent of the segment was to "[poke] fun at commercial morning breakfast shows and their often-condescending portrayal of rural and regional areas".

== Transport ==
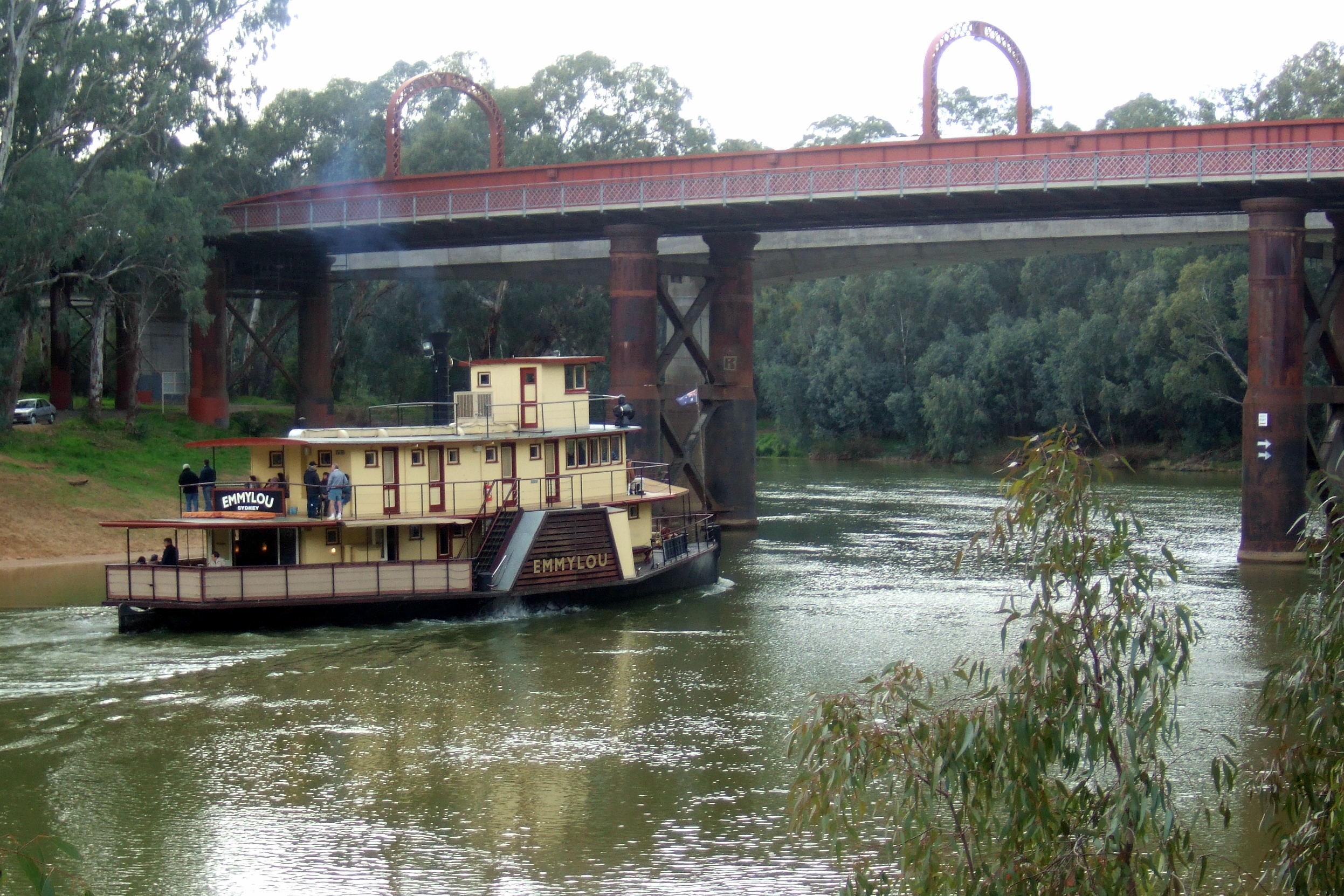
The Echuca-Moama Road Rail Bridge

Echuca is connected over the Murray River to Moama by the Echuca-Moama Road Rail Bridge, completed in 1878. This historically significant bridge has riveted iron spans supported on cast iron pillars. Trains no longer run on this bridge; a dedicated rail bridge has been constructed next to the old bridge, which now only carries road vehicles.

A second Murray River crossing, named Dhungala Bridge, was completed in July 2022.

Echuca-Moama Transit runs three bus services hourly to Echuca East, Echuca South and Moama. The terminus is the Old Echuca Post Office on Hare Street. V/Line operates the Echuca line rail service from the local station to Melbourne via Bendigo. Echuca Airport is also located nearby.

== Geography ==
Situated at the junction of the Murray and Campaspe Rivers, Echuca lies on the Northern Plains Grassland. It is flood prone.

=== Climate ===
Echuca has a cold semi-arid climate (BSk) with Mediterranean climate (Csa) tendencies, with warm to hot, dry summers and cool to cold winters that are quite cloudy.

Climate data for Echuca Aerodrome (1881–2024, extremes 1957–2024); 96 m AMSL; 36.16° S, 144.76° E
Month	Jan	Feb	Mar	Apr	May	Jun	Jul	Aug	Sep	Oct	Nov	Dec	Year
Record high °C (°F)	46.9 (116.4)	46.8 (116.2)	41.8 (107.2)	38.2 (100.8)	28.4 (83.1)	24.4 (75.9)	24.2 (75.6)	26.8 (80.2)	36.0 (96.8)	38.4 (101.1)	43.2 (109.8)	46.3 (115.3)	46.9 (116.4)
Mean daily maximum °C (°F)	31.0 (87.8)	30.7 (87.3)	27.3 (81.1)	22.3 (72.1)	17.6 (63.7)	14.3 (57.7)	13.5 (56.3)	15.3 (59.5)	18.4 (65.1)	22.2 (72.0)	26.1 (79.0)	29.1 (84.4)	22.3 (72.2)
Mean daily minimum °C (°F)	15.2 (59.4)	15.2 (59.4)	12.9 (55.2)	9.4 (48.9)	6.6 (43.9)	4.6 (40.3)	3.8 (38.8)	4.7 (40.5)	6.3 (43.3)	8.6 (47.5)	11.2 (52.2)	13.5 (56.3)	9.3 (48.8)
Record low °C (°F)	5.0 (41.0)	5.8 (42.4)	1.0 (33.8)	0.4 (32.7)	−1.9 (28.6)	−5.0 (23.0)	−5.5 (22.1)	−5.0 (23.0)	−1.5 (29.3)	0.2 (32.4)	1.3 (34.3)	0.0 (32.0)	−5.5 (22.1)
Average precipitation mm (inches)	28.5 (1.12)	25.6 (1.01)	30.6 (1.20)	32.7 (1.29)	40.4 (1.59)	42.6 (1.68)	40.5 (1.59)	42.0 (1.65)	38.4 (1.51)	42.7 (1.68)	33.0 (1.30)	30.0 (1.18)	426.9 (16.81)
Average precipitation days	4.0	3.6	4.6	5.8	8.3	10.3	11.5	11.3	9.3	8.3	6.0	5.1	88.1
Average afternoon relative humidity (%)	29	31	37	44	56	65	64	57	50	41	34	30	45

== Media ==
The local newspaper, The Riverine Herald is published by McPherson Media Group three days a week.

Radio stations that broadcast to the town are ABC Central Victoria, Hit91.9, 3BO FM, and community radio based station, EMFM.

Network television is broadcast in the Echuca region by the Seven Network, WIN Television (affiliated with the Nine Network), Network 10, the Australian Broadcasting Corporation (ABC) and the Special Broadcasting Service (SBS).

Of the three commercial networks, WIN Television airs a half-hour WIN News bulletin each weeknight at 5.30 pm, produced from a newsroom in the city and broadcast from studios in Wollongong.

Short local news updates and weather updates are broadcast by Network 10 throughout the day, produced and broadcast from its Hobart studios. The Seven Network airs short local news and weather updates throughout the day, produced and broadcast from its Canberra studios.

== Education ==
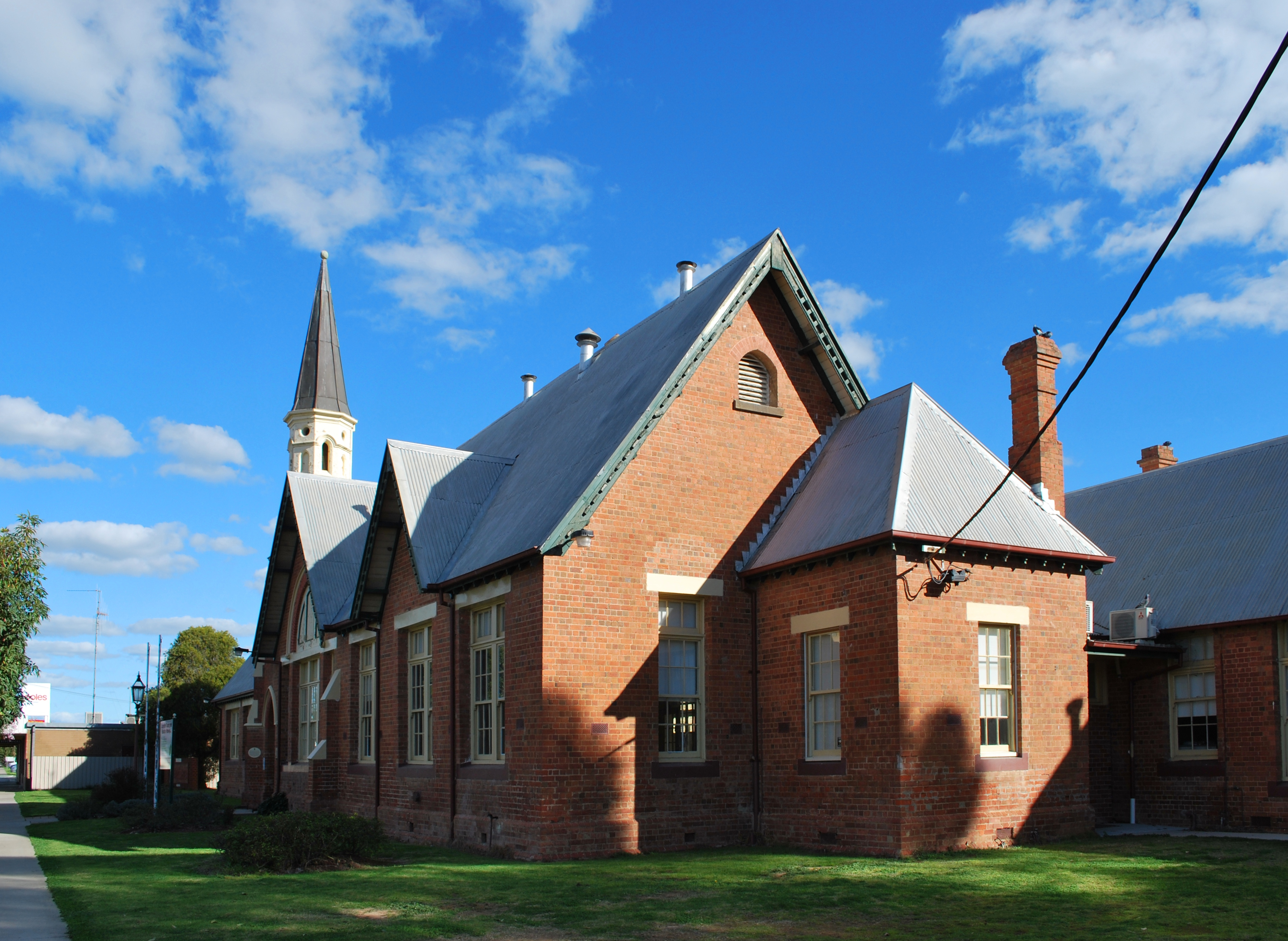
The historic Echuca Primary School building

Echuca is served by several primary schools: 208 Primary School, Echuca East Primary School, Echuca Specialist School, St. Mary's Primary School and the newly constructed Twin Rivers Primary School (opened in 2018). Twin Rivers was formed by merging the former Echuca West and Echuca South Primary schools, and shares a place with Echuca Twin River Specialist School (formerly Echuca Specialist School)

Echuca has two high schools. Echuca College, a state secondary college, was formed in 2006 by the amalgamation of Echuca Technical College and Echuca High School. St. Joseph's College, a Catholic co-ed secondary school, occupies the site of a former Brigidine convent that opened in 1886. Moama Anglican Grammar School, just over the border in New South Wales, also attracts students from Echuca.

Bendigo TAFE has a campus in Echuca, offering education up to diploma level in various fields.

== Sports ==
The town has two Australian rules football clubs. The Murray Bombers competes in the Goulburn Valley Football League, while Echuca United competes in the Murray Football League.

The town is also home to the Echuca Rockets, an inclusive all ability football team competing in the Victorian FIDA Football League - Northern Conference.

Echuca has numerous other teams competing in regional and state sporting leagues, including netball, soccer, and field hockey. Echuca formerly fielded a baseball team, the Rich River Mariners, who played in the Goulburn Valley Baseball League. The team disbanded in 2006.

Echuca has a horse racing club, the Echuca Racing Club, which schedules around twelve race meetings a year including the Echuca Cup meeting in March.

Echuca Harness Racing Club conducts regular meetings at its racetrack in the town.

Golfers play at the Echuca Back Nine Golf Course on Eyre and McKenzie Streets.

=== Water sports ===
- Swimming: Echuca Swimming Club. 50 metre indoor pool. YMCA Echuca War Memorial Aquatic Centre.
- Canoeing: Echuca-Moama Canoe Club and Inland Outriggers.
- Waterskiing: The Southern 80 Ski Race held in February finishing line is in Echuca, starting at the Torrumbarry Weir. Established over 60 years ago the race is held by the Moama Water Sports Club. The Southern 80 has become iconic with the 2-day event attracting more than 80,000 visitors to the area.

In 2006, the Barry Beehag water ski race was established in honour of Barry Beehag, a founding and life member of the Moama Water Sports Club.

== Notable people ==
- Mary Doyle, politician
- James Ashton, politician
- Lou Bennett, musician
- Frank Block, politician
- Roy Cameron, pathologist
- Travis Fimmel, actor and model
- Henry Hopwood (1813–1869), founder of Echuca, born in Bolton, Lancashire, England
- Sarah Jones, journalist
- Hyllus Maris, Aboriginal activist
- Hugh McKenzie, politician and stock station agent.
- James McManus, naval officer
- Brian Lord, country music artist
- Bill Onus, Aboriginal activist
- Leith Ratten, convicted of murdering his wife
- Justin Smith, author and journalist
- Reginald Smithers, lawyer and judge
- Luka Muller, comedian and radio presenter

=== Sport ===
- George Bazeley, hockey player
- Geoff Bloomfield, equestrian
- Michael Braun, Australian rules footballer
- Donna Burns, basketballer
- Clem Carr, Australian rules footballer
- Tommy Carr, Australian rules footballer
- Jane Chalmers, basketballer
- Daniel Connors, Australian rules footballer
- Bert Cowley, Australian rules footballer
- Simon Eishold, Australian rules footballer
- Ted Fleming, Australian rules footballer
- Bert Foster, Australian rules footballer
- Gordon Geddes, Australian rules footballer
- Jack Graham, Australian rules footballer
- Shadrach James, Australian rules footballer
- Bill Kyme, Australian rules footballer
- Phil McCumisky, Australian rules footballer
- Mal McGillivray, Australian rules footballer
- Ken Montgomery, Australian rules footballer
- Jack Mueller, Australian rules footballer
- Todd Murphy, cricketer
- Caitlyn Nevins, netball player
- Kevin O'Neill, Australian rules footballer
- Clayton Oliver, Australian rules footballer
- Col Pearse, Paralympic swimmer
- Trevor Rowlands, Australian rules footballer
- Dick Robertson, Australian rules footballer
- Jack Quinn, Australian rules footballer
- John Quirk, Australian rules footballer
- Sam Sheldon, Australian rules footballer
- Thomas Swann, rower
- Bill Talbot, Australian rules footballer
- Andrew Thomson, Australian rules footballer
- Jack Viney, Australian rules footballer
- Andrew Walker, Australian rules footballer
- George Williams, Australian rules footballer
- Oliver Wines, Australian rules footballer and Brownlow Medalist

== Sister city ==
Echuca's sister city was Whitehorse, Yukon, Canada. However, Whitehorse terminated the special relationship in 2008 due to the relationship being "strictly ceremonial in nature".
