= James Quirk =

James Quirk may refer to:

- James P. Quirk (1926–2020), American economist
- James R. Quirk (1884–1932), American magazine editor
- Jamie Quirk (born 1954), American baseball player
- James Quirk (Isle of Man), High Bailiff of Douglas, Isle of Man 1817-1820
