= Echuca Wharf =

Timber wharf in Echuca, Victoria, Australia

Coordinates: 36°07′12″S 144°44′50″E

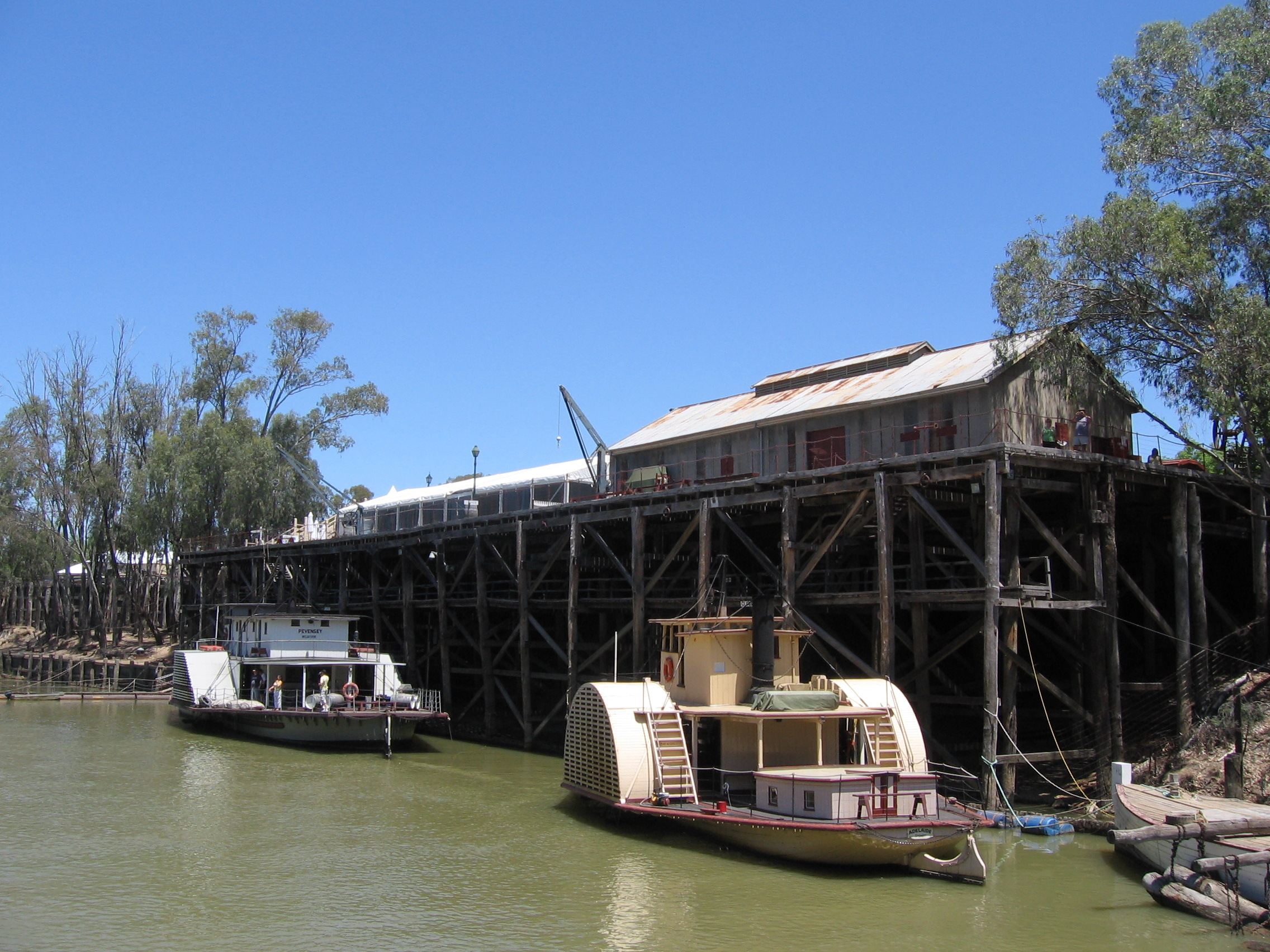
Echuca Wharf in 2008

Echuca Wharf is a historic timber wharf on the Murray River at Echuca in Victoria, Australia. The simultaneous construction of the wharf and the railway line between Echuca and Melbourne in 1864 saw the Port of Echuca become the second largest port in Victoria and opened access to Melbourne ports and markets for much of the Murray-Darling basin.

The wharf is still operating, servicing paddlesteamers for the tourist trade. In 2007, the wharf was added to the Australian National Heritage List.

In 2015, the Wharf underwent a total restoration, with most of the original timber structure being replaced by locally milled Red Gum pylons, planks and beams.

The site is listed on the Victorian Heritage Register and is included in a Heritage Overlay.

== See also ==
List of Murray–Darling steamboats
