= Cruls =

Cruls may refer to:

- Luís Cruls (1848–1908), Belgian-born Brazilian astronomer and geodesist
- Cruls (crater), a crater on Mars
- Cruls Islands, located in the Wilhelm Archipelago
- Refuge Astronomer Cruls, Brazilian Antarctic summer facility
