= David Meade (author) =

American end-times conspiracy theorist

- Born: United States
- Education: Astronomy (claimed) (Note: This claim is unverifiable, since "David Meade" is a pen name and the author in question has not revealed his real name.)
- Alma mater: University of Louisville (claimed)
- Occupation: Self-described "Christian numerologist"
- Known for: Nibiru, doomsday predictions

Notes
- The author is known only by his pen name and some information is unverifiable since he has not chosen to reveal his true identity.

David Meade is the pen name of an American author and end-times conspiracy theorist. He is best known for making numerous failed predictions regarding the end times, including that a hidden planet named Nibiru (sometimes known as Planet X) will destroy planet Earth.

Meade, who describes himself as a "Christian numerologist", claims to have attended the University of Louisville and studied astronomy, "among other subjects." Because he works pseudonymously, The Washington Post reported that the university could not confirm whether he had ever been a student there. As an investigator and researcher, Meade has written and self-published at least 13 books, and has made appearances and on Coast to Coast AM, The Washington Post, Glenn Beck Program, Paul Begley's YouTube program, and the Daily Express.

== Early life ==
Meade claims he was raised as a Catholic and attended the University of Louisville, studying astronomy and other subjects. He also claims to have earned a master's degree in statistics. According to his profile page on his website, he has worked for both the federal government and private industry. He additionally stated that he has written investigative reports on abnormal state administration and executives for Fortune 1000 organizations. It is not known which companies he worked for. On his Google Plus page, he also claims to be an investigative journalist.

In a September 2017 The Washington Post article, Meade said that he studied astronomy and that he attended a university in Kentucky but declined to say which campus he attended due to safety concerns. He additionally refused to answer questions concerning which Fortune 1000 organizations he worked for and what he does for a living. When he was asked where he lives, he claimed that he lives in "the heart of a major disaster" zone of Hurricane Irma, but did not specify the state or city.

Meade appeared on Coast to Coast AM with George Noory in January 2017 and was interviewed on the national Glenn Beck Program in September 2017. In addition to books about Planet X, he has written books related to politics, such as The Coming Clinton Economic Collapse (2016) and The Coup D'état Against President Donald J. Trump (2017).

== Predictions ==
Meade received extensive media attention following his predictions that Nibiru would destroy Earth on September 23, 2017. He first predicted Nibiru would hit the Earth in October 2017, but moved it forward to September 23. On September 21, an Orange County, California television station accidentally displayed his prediction in an emergency alert, and broadcasting officials stated that the false alert was caused by a glitch from a test by the Emergency Alert System. On September 21, he claimed in a Glenn Beck interview to have seen Nibiru from his house and that other people would see the sign as well. Meade then changed his mind and stated that Nibiru would not collide with Earth on September 23.

=== October 2017 predictions ===
As September 23 passed, Meade again revised the apocalypse to October, making new predictions for that month, such as Nibiru eclipsing the sun on October 5 and that several people would levitate into the sky (including then-current U.S. President Donald Trump and Vice President Mike Pence) followed by a nuclear attack by North Korea, China, and Russia on the United States. He predicted other events for that month, such as a series of magnitude 9.8 earthquakes; that the Earth's pole would shift by 30 degrees; that the United States would be split in half; and that Barack Obama would be elected as U.S. president for an illegal third term. He also predicted that the 7-year Great Tribulation would start on October 15 and stated "[t]hat's when the action starts", but the month passed, and his predictions were wrong. His October 2017 predictions were described in his book Will Planet X Signal the Rapture?

=== Predictions for 2018 ===
In an interview with YouTube pastor Paul Begley, Meade made several predictions for 2018, such as North Korea becoming a world-class superpower in March 2018 and predicting that Nibiru would destroy the Earth in spring. In an article published by International Business Times on February 15, 2018, Meade announced that the apocalypse would begin in March 2018, but no date was given. He stated that several events in 2018, such as the January 2018 super blue blood moon eclipse, the 2018 Winter Olympics, and Israel's 70-year celebration of independence, were signs of the apocalypse. He called several officials in the United Nations "crazy people" after voting against the United States' decision to recognize Jerusalem as the capital of Israel, and his prediction came just 42 days before the blood moon eclipse.

After March 2018 passed, he changed the apocalypse prediction to April 23, 2018, in which he also predicted the Sun, Moon, Jupiter, and Virgo will signal the rapture, and that Nibiru would destroy the Earth that day. He referred to his prediction as "end of days convergence" and that the "disappearance of the Church will occur". Meade became the first preacher since William Miller to predict that the world would end on 23 April. On April 19, 2018, he stated that reports saying that he predicted the world would be destroyed on 23 April were "fake news", but that the rapture—but not the end of the world—would take place on an unspecified date between May and December 2018. He stated that the rapture would bring in seven years of "tribulation", followed by 1,000 years of "peace and prosperity", before the world is destroyed. April 23, 2018 passed without incident and Meade's prediction of a rapture taking place has been labeled by some as one of the latest "kooky" doomsday calls.

=== Other predictions ===
Meade made similar predictions in 2015 in his book Rapture 2015 and Planet X and in his 2013 book Comet Ison and the Return of Jesus, in which he stated that Comet Ison is the biblical star Wormwood and that it ties to Nibiru. In September 2017, he also made predictions that North Korea would launch a nuclear attack against Yellowstone Caldera from a used Russian submarine parked off the coast of California, and that the attack would trigger a supervolcano eruption. He believed that there would be flooding similar to the Genesis flood narrative and that only believers would survive. He also believed that Russia would be able to wipe the United States out in less than 30 minutes if a war broke out between the two countries.

== Reactions ==
Meade has faced criticism from fellow Christians: Ed Stetzer, writing for Christianity Today, stated that "there is no such thing as a 'Christian numerologist'", and described Meade as "a made-up expert in a made-up field talking about a made-up event." Christopher M. Graney, a professor with the Vatican Observatory Foundation, noted that the supposedly unique astronomical event cited by Meade as a harbinger of doom was, in fact, quite common, having occurred four times in the last millennium. His theories were also debunked by NASA and Time writer Jeff Kluger, with NASA stating that Nibiru does not exist.

Albert Mohler, the president of the Southern Baptist Theological Seminary stated, upon Meade's previous prediction in September 2017, that "Christians are not called to be the setters of dates and the anticipation of the calendar." He went on to criticize Meade's predictions saying that "this kind of thinking should be an embarrassment to Biblical Christians". Judi McLeod labeled Meade as a false prophet on her website Canada Free Press after his prophecies failed to come true. ATLAH World Missionary Church pastor James David Manning has also called Meade a fraud in one of his YouTube videos. Brazilian astronomer Duília de Mello called his predictions and theories rubbish, and said Nibiru would have been seen during the eclipse and that Meade was using calculations based on the Gregorian calendar. British journalist Nick Pope stated that his theory had lack of critical thinking.

Meade has been compared to other failed doomsday preachers, such as Harold Camping and Nostradamus, and his September 23 prediction has been compared to other failed dates, such as the 2012 phenomenon and Y2K fulfilling Christian prophecy. After September 23, 2017, passed, a European mind reader and mentalist with the same name received multiple death threats when news websites linked him to the predictions. The man denied being the doomsday predictor and worked with a legal expert to have the false reports removed. Meade's Planet X – The 2017 Arrival book also received criticism as nonsense and plagiarism, with only 25% being his own work. On January 25, 2018, his predictions were labeled as "hype" by The Washington Post in a story about the Doomsday Clock.

== Calculations ==
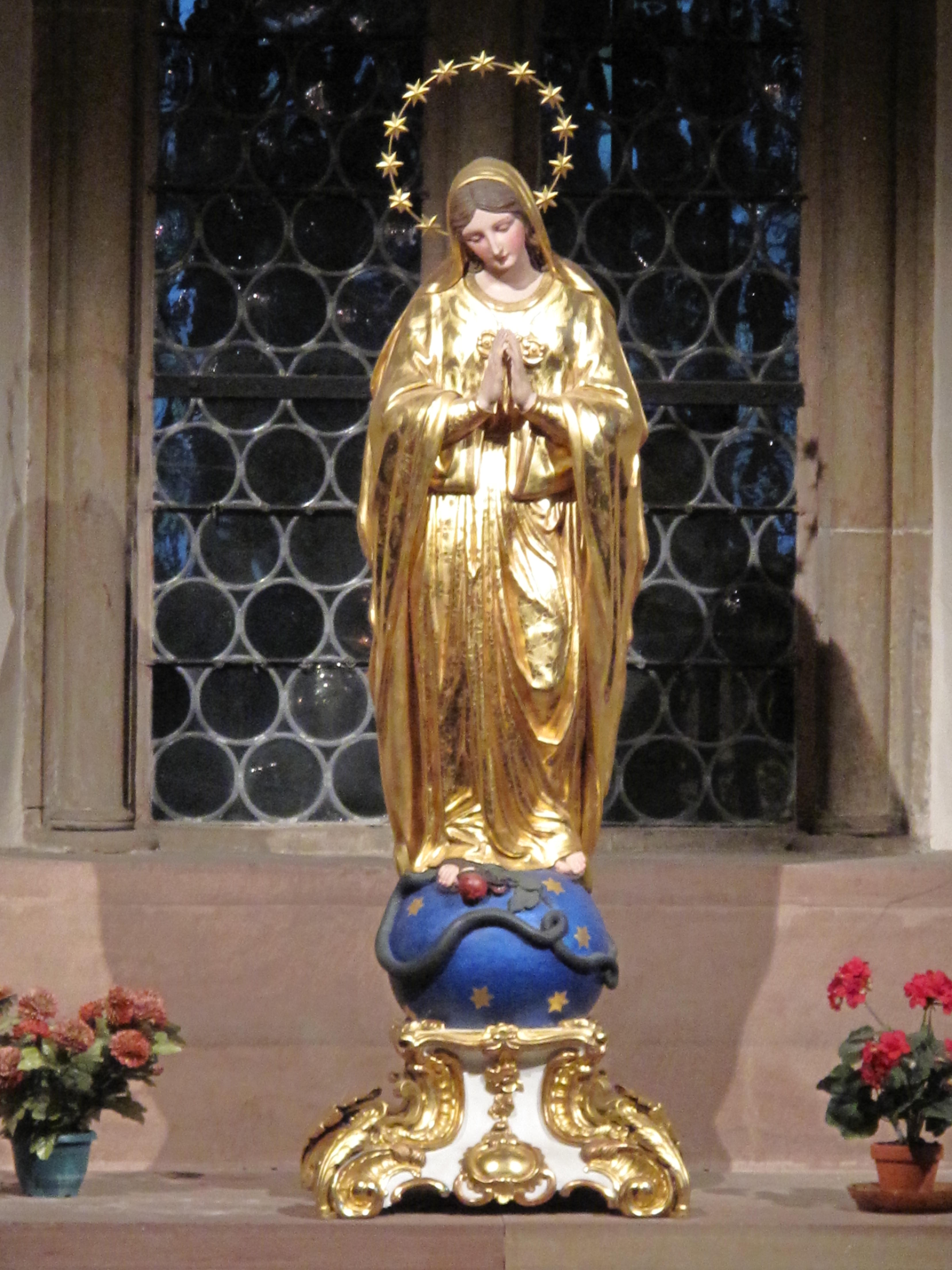
Meade trusted that Nibiru's entry on September 23, 2017, was attached to a prophetic perusing of the Woman of the Apocalypse (depiction pictured).

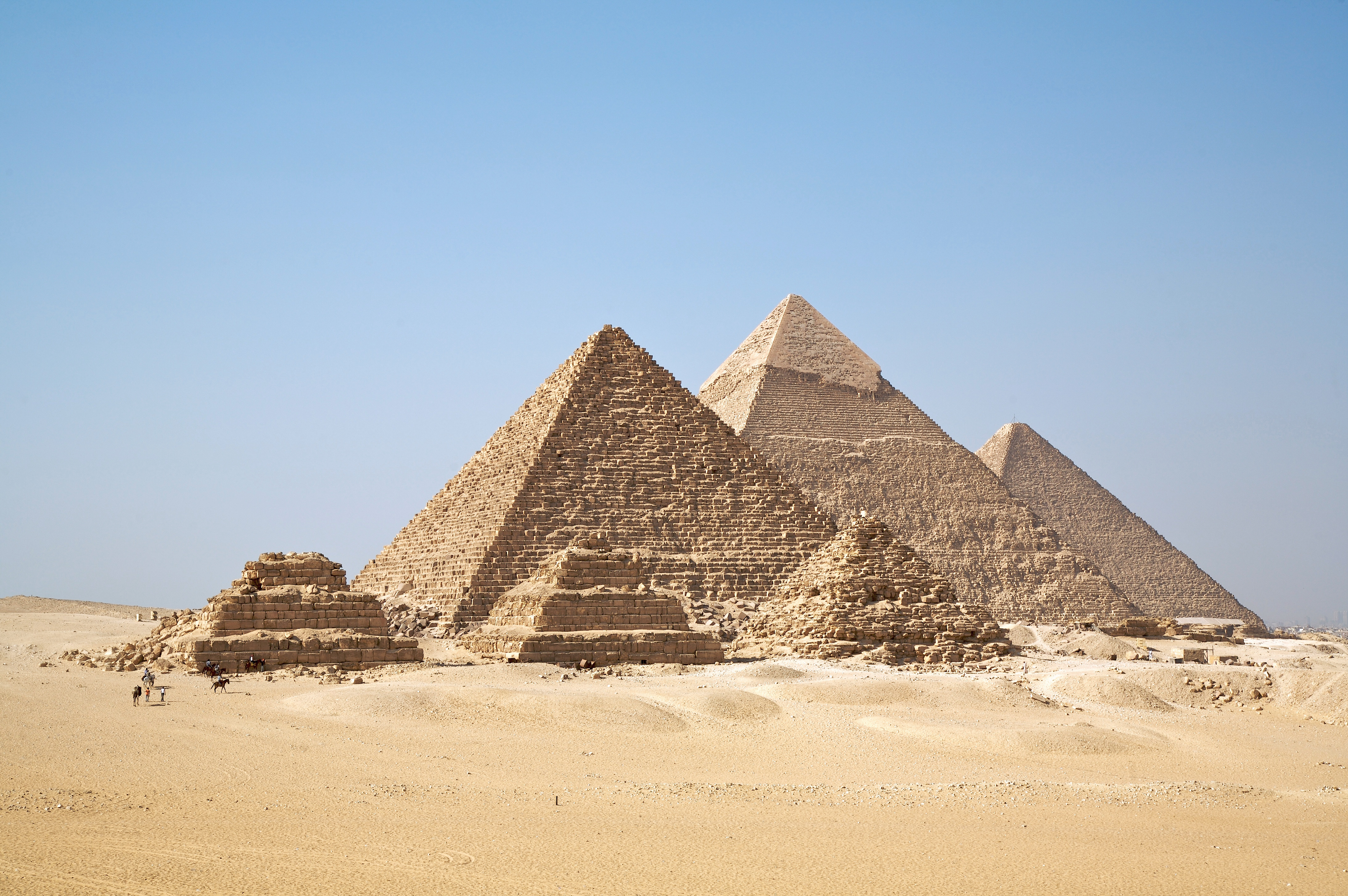
David Meade believed the 23 September prediction was revealed to him in the Giza Pyramids, including the Great Pyramid.

Meade told The Washington Post that his 23 September 2017 prediction was based on numerical codes in the Bible. He also based his predictions on what he claimed are coded messages in the Giza Pyramids of Egypt. The specific focus of his prediction revolved around the Woman of the Apocalypse (referring to Revelation 12), another event that was supposed to take place on 23 September when a certain configuration of the Earth, Sun, Moon, and Virgo would happen. He stated the significant number for his September 23 prediction is the number 33, on the grounds that "Jesus lived for 33 years" and "Elohim, the Canaanite god who was later adopted as the supreme god of ancient Israel, is mentioned 33 times in the Bible". He stated several events, such as the solar eclipse of 21 August 2017, Hurricane Harvey, Hurricane Irma, and the Mexico earthquakes were a sign that Nibiru would appear on 23 September based on the Bible chapter verse Luke 21:25–26.

Meade's April 23 prediction was based on passage 12:1–2 in the Book of Revelation, which states "And a great sign appeared in heaven: a woman clothed in the sun, with the moon under her feet and a crown of twelve stars on her head. She was pregnant and crying out in the pain and agony of giving birth". He referred to the woman as Virgo and stated that the alignment represents Lion of Judah. When discussing the 7-year tribulation and rapture, he stated "The Book of Revelation states that men will approach Armageddon on horseback. Nibiru is here and the earth will be prepared for the next event on its calendar. That's all in the Book of Revelation, too."

== Bibliography ==
- Meade, David (2013). Planet X – God's Endgame. Self published on eBookIt.com. ISBN 978-1456615895.
- Meade, David. (2013) Fraud Prevention. Self-published on eBookIt.com ASIN B00CMJO7U6
- Meade, David. (2013) Mysterious Islands. Self-published on eBookit.com. ASIN B00CY2OA3K
- Meade, David. (2013) Research for Writers. Self-published on eBookit.com. ASIN B00E0MKDFQ
- Meade, David. (2014) You Can Write a Best-Selling Info Book! Self-published on eBookit.com. ASIN B00L72JDUI
- Meade, David. (2014) Web Design for Authors: Every Author Needs a Website!. Self-published on eBookit.com. ASIN B00NJBT184
- Meade, David. (2015) Rapture 2015 and Planet X. Self-published on eBookIt.com ISBN 978-1456624347
- Meade, David; Meade, Anne. (2015) Own a Piece of Paradise In the Florida Keys, Self-published on eBookit.com. ASIN B019E4FTS0
- Meade, David. (2015) Hitler's Escape to Argentina. Self-published on eBookIt.com ASIN B01A27FUFK
- Meade, David. (2016) Will Planet X Signal the Rapture? Self-published on eBookIt.com ISBN 978-1456626235
- Meade, David (2016). Planet X – The 2017 Arrival (Paperback ed.). Self published on eBookIt.com. ISBN 978-1456626921.
- Meade, David. (2016) The Coming Clinton Economic Collapse Kindle Edition. Kindle EBooks. ISBN 978-1456627195
- Meade, David (2017). The Prepper's Guide to Surviving EMP Attacks, Solar Flares and Grid Failures. Self published on eBookIt.com. ISBN 978-1456629342.
- Meade, David. (2017) The End of Days – Planet X and Beyond Kindle Edition. Self-published on eBookIt.com ASIN B0778KK2GD

== See also ==
- List of dates predicted for apocalyptic events
- Apocalypticism
