= Locator Island =

Island in Wilhelm Archipelago, Antarctica

Locator Island (65°11′S 64°30′W) is the highest of the Roca Islands, lying 0.2 nautical miles (0.4 km) north of the largest island in the group, in the Wilhelm Archipelago, Antarctica. It was mapped by the Falkland Islands Dependencies Survey from photos taken by Hunting Aerosurveys Ltd in 1956–57 and from the helicopter of HMS Protector in March 1958. The island was so named by the UK Antarctic Place-Names Committee because this distinctive island provides a useful mark for locating one's position when navigating French Passage.

== See also ==
- List of Antarctic and sub-Antarctic islands
