= NGC 1536 =

Galaxy in the constellation Reticulum

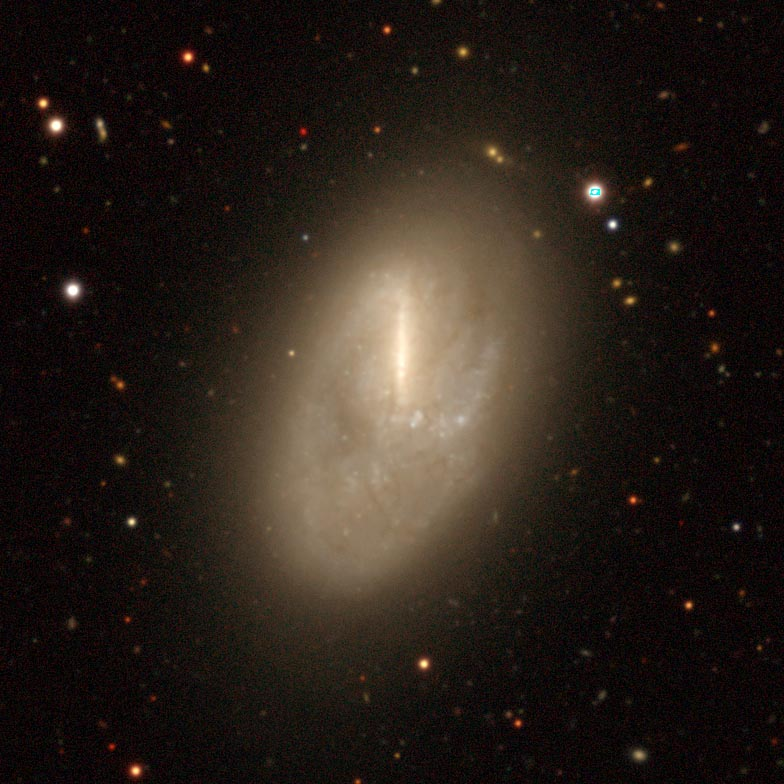
- A Legacy Survey DR10 image of NGC 1536

Observation data (J2000 epoch)
- Constellation: Reticulum
- Right ascension: 04^{h} 11^{m} 00.90^{s}
- Declination: −56° 29′ 13.0″
- Redshift: 0.004059 ± 4.30e-5
- Distance: 57 Mly (17.71 Mpc)
- Apparent magnitude (V): 12.5

Characteristics
- Type: SB(s)c pec?
- Size: 42,000 ly
- Apparent size (V): 1.905′ × 1.259′
- Notable features: N/A

Other designations
- ESO 157-IG 005, ESO 040957-5636.9, AM 0409-563, WISEA J041059.94-562850.6

NGC 1536 is a peculiar barred spiral galaxy located around 57 million light-years away in the constellation Reticulum. It was discovered on December 4th, 1834 by the English astronomer John Herschel, and it has a diameter around 42,000 light-years. NGC 1536 is not known to have much star-formation, and it is not known to have an active galactic nucleus.

== SN 1997D ==
SN 1997D was a Type II Supernova in NGC 1536 discovered by Duília de Mello on 14 January 1997. SN 1997D had a low expansion velocity, and it is believed that the explosion produced a stellar mass black hole, instead of a neutron star. SN 1997D was located in the southernmost part of NGC 1536.

== Gallery ==
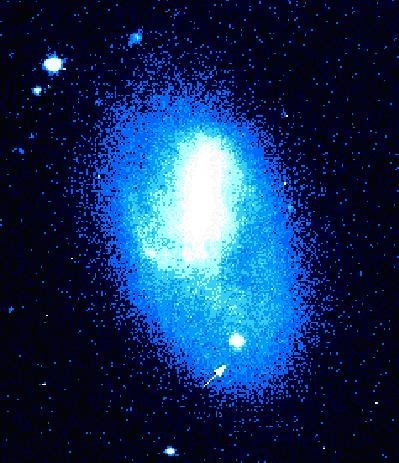
SN 1997D is visible in the southern part of NGC 1536 in the image above

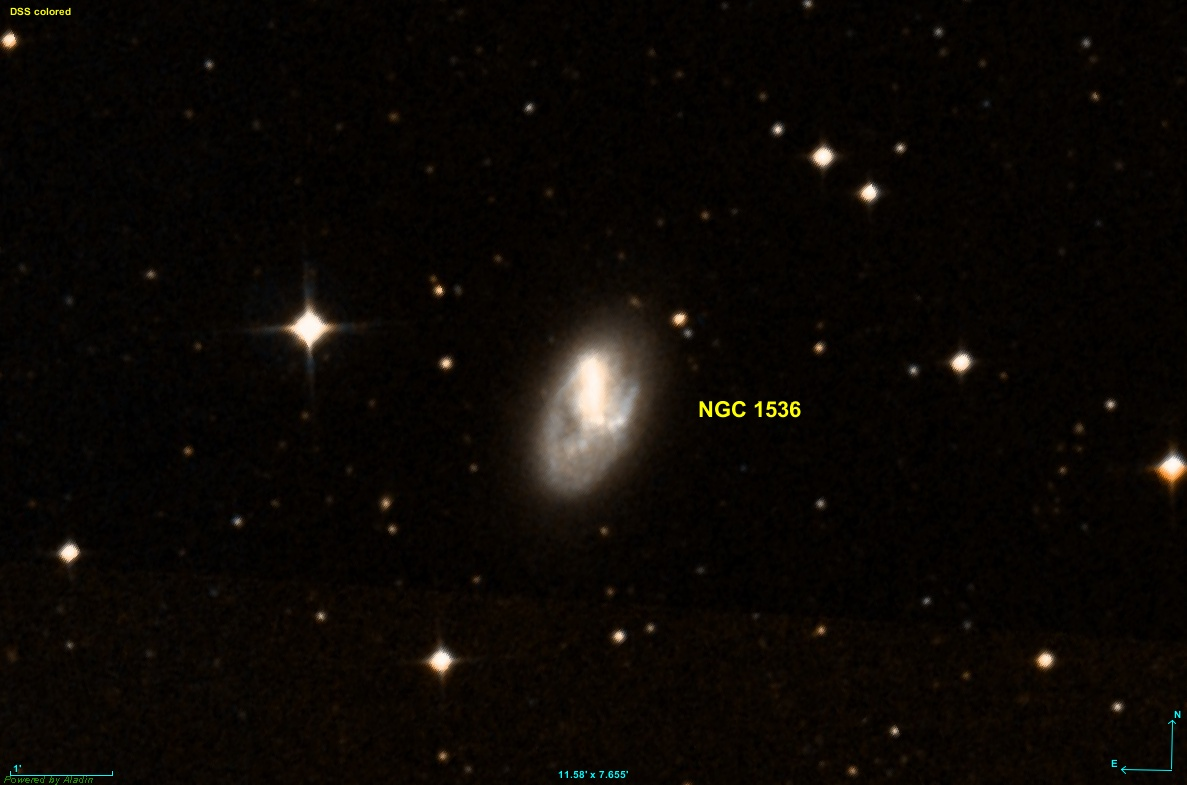
A Digitized Sky Survey (DSS) image of NGC 1536
