= Nibiru cataclysm =

Supposed disastrous doomsday scenario

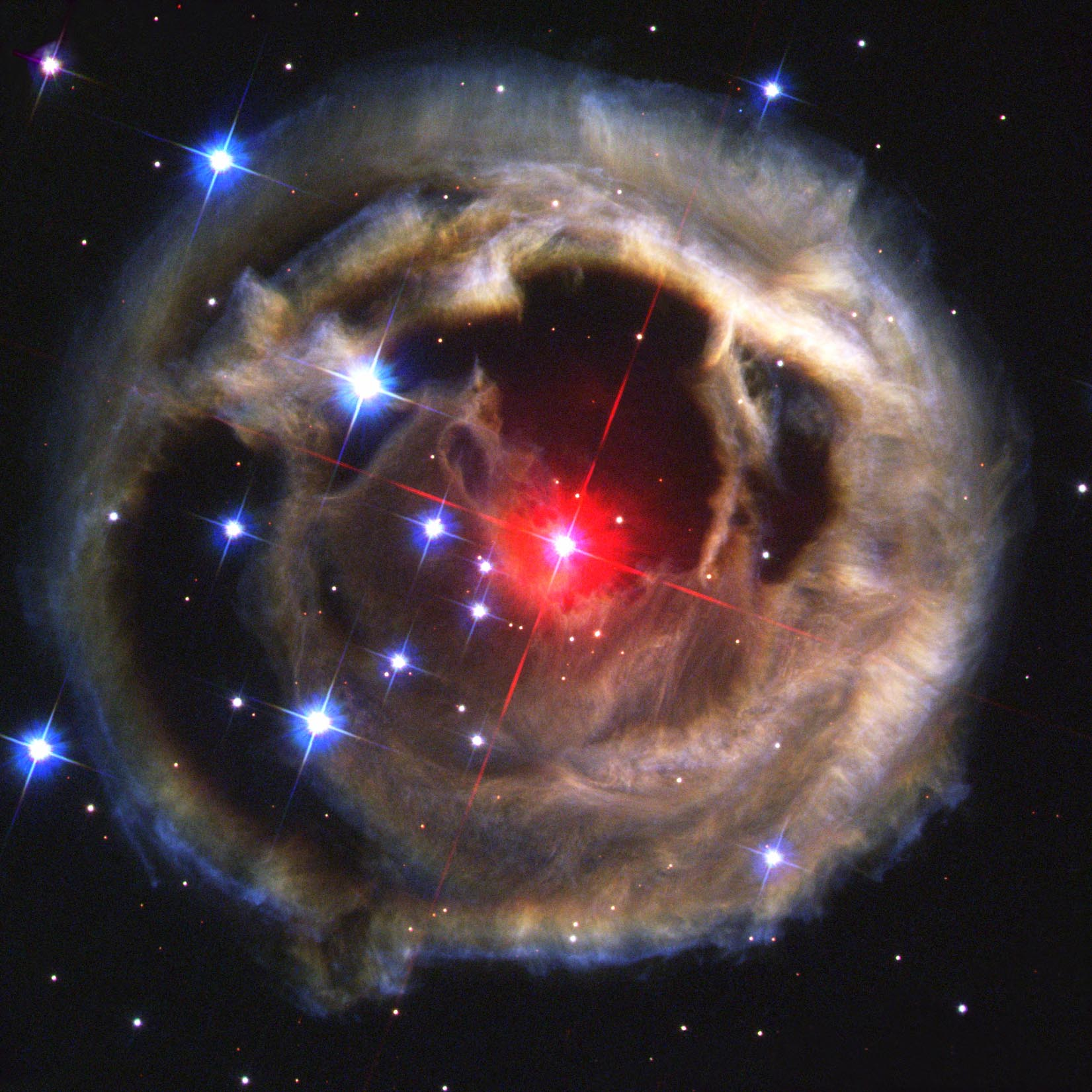
- V838 Monocerotis, a variable star accompanied by a light echo, has been erroneously portrayed as an approaching planet or brown dwarf on a collision course with Earth.
- Claims: Earth's imminent collision or near miss with a giant planetoid
- Related scientific disciplines: Astronomy, archaeology
- Year proposed: 1995
- Original proponents: Nancy Lieder
- Subsequent proponents: David Meade, Terral Croft, Paul Begley

The Nibiru cataclysm is a supposed disastrous encounter between Earth and a large planetary object (either a collision or a near-miss) that certain groups believed would take place in the early 21st century. Believers in this doomsday event usually refer to this object as Nibiru or Planet X. The idea was first put forward in 1995 by Nancy Lieder, founder of the website ZetaTalk. Lieder claims she is a contactee with the ability to receive messages from extraterrestrials from the Zeta Reticuli star system through an implant in her brain. She states that she was chosen to warn mankind that the object would sweep through the inner Solar System in May 2003 (though that date was later postponed) causing Earth to undergo a physical pole shift that would destroy most of humanity.

The prediction has subsequently spread beyond Lieder's website and has been embraced by numerous Internet doomsday groups. In the late 2000s, it became closely associated with the 2012 phenomenon. Since 2012, the Nibiru cataclysm has frequently reappeared in the popular media, usually linked to newsmaking astronomical objects such as Comet ISON or Planet Nine. Although the name "Nibiru" is derived from the works of the "ancient astronaut" writer Zecharia Sitchin and his interpretations of Babylonian and Sumerian mythology, he denied any connection between his work and various claims of a coming apocalypse. A prediction by self-described "Christian numerologist" David Meade that the Nibiru cataclysm would occur on 23 September 2017 received extensive media coverage.

The idea that a planet-sized object will collide with or closely pass by Earth in the near future is not supported by any scientific evidence and has been rejected by astronomers and planetary scientists as pseudoscience and an Internet hoax. Such an object would have destabilised the orbits of the planets to the extent that their effects would be easily observable today. Astronomers have hypothesized many planets beyond Neptune, and though many have been disproved, there are some that remain possible, such as Planet Nine. All the current hypotheses describe planets in orbits that would keep them well beyond Neptune throughout their orbit, even when they were closest to the Sun.

== History ==
=== Nancy Lieder and ZetaTalk ===
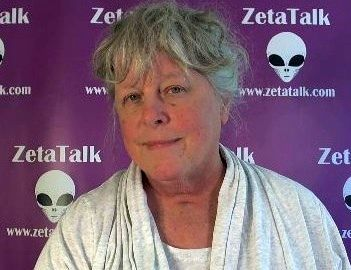
Nancy Lieder in June 2013

The idea of the Nibiru encounter originated with Nancy Lieder, a Wisconsin woman who claims that as a girl she was contacted by gray extraterrestrials called Zetans, who implanted a communications device in her brain. In 1995, she founded the website ZetaTalk to disseminate her ideas. Lieder first came to public attention on Internet newsgroups during the build-up to Comet Hale–Bopp's 1997 perihelion (the closest approach to the Sun). She stated, claiming to speak as the Zetans, that: "The Hale–Bopp comet does not exist. It is a fraud, perpetrated by those who would have the teeming masses quiescent until it is too late. Hale–Bopp is nothing more than a distant star, and will draw no closer." She claimed that the Hale–Bopp story was manufactured to distract people from the imminent arrival of a large planetary object, "Planet X", which would soon pass by Earth and destroy civilization. After Hale–Bopp's perihelion revealed it as one of the brightest and longest-observed comets of the last century, Lieder removed the first two sentences of her initial statement from her site, though they can still be found in Google's archives. Her claims eventually made the New York Times.

Lieder described Planet X as roughly four times the size of Earth, and said that its closest approach would occur on May 27, 2003, resulting in Earth's rotation ceasing for exactly 5.9 terrestrial days. This would be followed by Earth's pole destabilising in a pole shift caused by magnetic attraction between Earth's core and the magnetism of the passing planet. This in turn would disrupt Earth's magnetic core and lead to subsequent displacement of Earth's crust. After the 2003 date passed without incident, Lieder said that it was merely a "white lie ... to fool the establishment". She refused to disclose the true date, saying that to do so would give those in power enough time to declare martial law and trap people in cities during the shift, leading to their deaths.

=== Zecharia Sitchin and Sumer ===
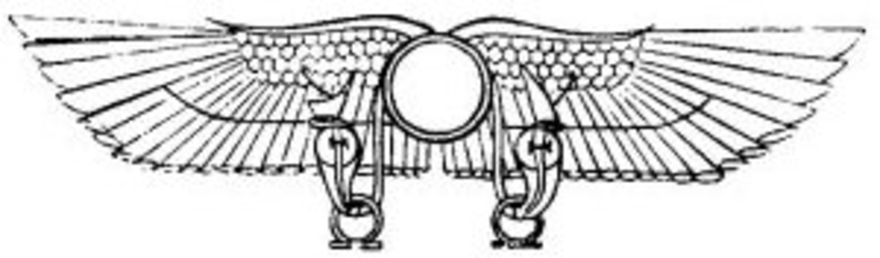
The "Winged Sun of Thebes", from Egyptian Mythology and Egyptian Christianity written by Samuel Sharpe in 1863. Proponents of the Nibiru cataclysm have often cited this as an ancient representation of Nibiru.

Although Lieder originally referred to the object as "Planet X", it has become deeply associated with Nibiru, a planet from the works of ancient astronaut proponent Zecharia Sitchin, particularly his book The 12th Planet. According to Sitchin's interpretation of ancient Mesopotamian religious texts, which has been shown to be based on a faulty understanding of Sumerian text, a giant planet (called Nibiru or Marduk) passes by Earth every 3,600 years, allowing its sentient inhabitants to interact with humanity. Sitchin identified these beings with the Anunnaki in Sumerian mythology and claimed that they were humanity's first gods. Lieder first made the connection between Nibiru and Planet X on her site in 1996 ("Planet X does exist, and it is the 12th Planet, one and the same").

Sitchin, who died in 2010, denied any connection between his work and Lieder's claims. In 2007, partly in response to Lieder's proclamations, Sitchin published a book, The End of Days, which set the time for the last passing of Nibiru by Earth at 556 BC, which would mean, given the object's supposed 3,600-year orbit, that it would return sometime around AD 2900. He did say that he believed that the Annunaki might return earlier by spaceship, and that the timing of their return would coincide with the shift from the astrological Age of Pisces to the Age of Aquarius, sometime between 2090 and 2370.

Modern proponents of the Nibiru cataclysm often cite the winged sun symbol as actually representing Nibiru, whom they believe would appear like a "winged star".

=== 2012 and the Mayan calendar ===
Though Lieder herself has not specified a new date for the object's return, many groups have taken up her idea and cited their own dates. One frequently cited date was December 21, 2012. This date had many apocalyptic associations, as it was the end of a cycle (bʼakʼtun) in the long count in the Maya calendar. Several writers published books connecting the encounter with 2012. Despite that date having passed, many websites still contend that Nibiru/Planet X is en route to Earth.

In 2012, Lieder claimed that U.S. President Barack Obama futilely attempted to announce the presence of Nibiru near the Sun. After 2012, she claimed that several world leaders had intended to announce the presence of Nibiru near the Sun on October 20, 2014. Two weeks after the supposed date of announcement, she claimed that it did not occur because of consternation amongst the establishment.

=== 2017 revival ===
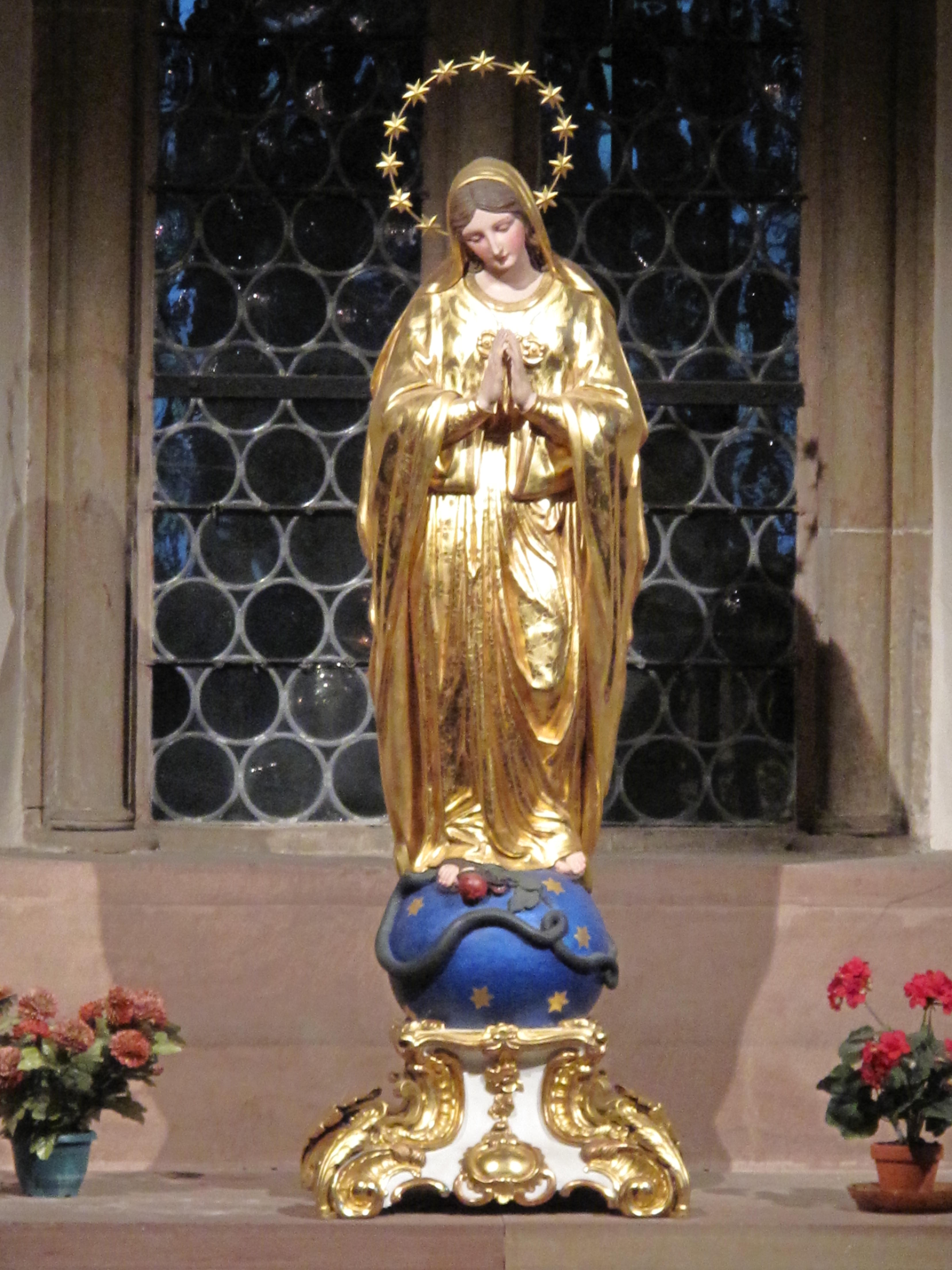
David Meade believed that Nibiru's arrival on September 23, 2017, was tied to an astrological reading of the Woman of the Apocalypse.

In 2017, a conspiracy theorist and self-proclaimed "Christian numerologist" named David Meade revived the Nibiru cataclysm by tying it to various passages from the Bible. Meade declared that these passages contained secret numerological codes, which revealed the exact date on which Nibiru would arrive. He also based his predictions on the geometry of the Giza Pyramids. Meade initially predicted that Nibiru would arrive in October 2017, but he later revised the date back to September 23. The specific focus of his prediction revolved around the Woman of the Apocalypse referring to a supposedly unique configuration on that date of the Sun, Moon, and planets in Virgo. He cited the solar eclipse of August 21, 2017, as a harbinger.

Meade's claims received extensive media attention. Viral fake news stories circulated across the Internet, adducing non-existent confirmations by NASA of Nibiru's existence on a course "headed straight for Earth". In reality, NASA's position is, and always has been, that Nibiru does not exist. Meade also faced criticism from fellow Christians; Ed Stetzer, writing for Christianity Today, stated that "there is no such thing as a 'Christian numerologist'", and described Meade as "a made-up expert in a made-up field talking about a made-up event". Christopher M. Graney, a professor with the Vatican Observatory Foundation, noted that the supposedly unique event was, in fact, quite common, having occurred four times in the last millennium. His September 23 theories were also debunked by Time writer Jeff Kluger. Brazilian astronomer Duília de Mello called his predictions and conjectures rubbish, and also said Nibiru would have been seen during the eclipse and that Meade was using calculations based on the Gregorian calendar.

After his predictions failed to come true, Meade revised them and declared that Nibiru would arrive on October 5, 2017, not on September 23. Meade announced that, on October 5, Nibiru would eclipse the Sun, and North Korea, China and Russia would launch a combined nuclear attack on the United States. Then, Earth would be devastated by a series of magnitude 9.8 earthquakes, Earth's magnetic pole would shift by 30 degrees, the United States would be split in half, and Barack Obama would be elected president for an unconstitutional third term. He predicted that the seven-year Great Tribulation would begin on October 15.

When October came, another apocalyptic writer, Terral Croft, predicted the arrival of Nibiru for November 19, a prediction again reported in the British tabloid press. Croft describes Nibiru as a "black star" at the edge of the Solar System, which, rather than colliding with Earth, would form an apocalyptic conjunction with Earth, leading to massive earthquakes. Croft claimed that earthquakes have been increasing worldwide in the leadup to the conjunction, though The Washington Post, quoting the United States Geological Survey, was quick to point out that earthquakes had decreased in both power and frequency over the year. Paul Begley, a YouTube conspiracy theorist and pastor at the Community Gospel Baptist Church in Knox, Indiana, also predicted in one of his YouTube videos that Nibiru would appear in 2017 and declared that the solar eclipse was a sign of the apocalypse and the rogue planet. Around 12 April 2018, Meade cited an alleged 23 April astrological conjunction in Virgo and predicted that Nibiru would appear during the conjunction and presage the Rapture; Space.com commented that nothing resembling such a conjunction was forecast for April 23.

== Scientific rejection ==
Astronomers reject the idea of Nibiru and have made efforts to inform the public that there is no threat to Earth. They point out that such an object so close to Earth would be easily visible to the naked eye and would cause noticeable effects in the orbits of the outer planets. Most photographs purporting to show "Nibiru" beside the Sun are lens flares, false images of the Sun caused by reflections within the lens. Claims that the object has been concealed behind the Sun are untenable.

An orbit like that of Nibiru (within the planetary region of the Solar System) is inconsistent with celestial mechanics. David Morrison, a NASA space scientist, explains that after just one previous flyby of Earth, such as proponents claim happened in Sumerian times, Earth itself would no longer be in its current near-circular orbit and would be likely to have lost its Moon. If Nibiru were a brown dwarf it would have even worse effects, as brown dwarfs are far more massive. Since Pluto is now frequently observed by backyard telescopes, any giant planet beyond Pluto would be easily observed by an amateur astronomer, and if such an object existed in the Solar System, it would have passed through the inner Solar System a million times by now.

Astronomer Mike Brown notes that if this object's orbit were as described, it would only have remained in the Solar System for about a million years before Jupiter expelled it, and, even if such a planet existed, its magnetic field would have no effect on Earth's. Lieder's assertions that the approach of Nibiru would cause Earth's rotation to stop or its axis to shift violate the laws of physics. In his rebuttal of Immanuel Velikovsky's Worlds in Collision, which made the same claim that Earth's rotation could be stopped and then restarted, Carl Sagan noted that "the energy required to brake the Earth is not enough to melt it, although it would result in a noticeable increase in temperature: The oceans would [be] raised to the boiling point of water ... [Also,] how does the Earth get started up again, rotating at approximately the same rate of spin? The Earth cannot do it by itself, because of the law of the conservation of angular momentum."

In a 2009 interview with the Discovery Channel, Mike Brown noted that, while it is not impossible that the Sun has a distant planetary companion, such an object would have to be lying very far from the observed regions of the Solar System to have no detectable gravitational effect on the other planets. A Mars-sized object could lie undetected at 300 AU (10 times the distance of Neptune); a Jupiter-sized object at 30,000 AU. To travel 1000 AU in two years, an object would need to be moving at 2400 km/s – faster than the galactic escape velocity. At that speed, any object would be shot out of the Solar System, and then out of the Milky Way galaxy into intergalactic space.

== Conspiracy theories ==
Many believers in the imminent approach of Planet X/Nibiru accuse NASA of deliberately covering up visual evidence of its existence. Certain polls have suggested that a number of people perceive NASA as a vast government agency that receives as much funding as the Department of Defense. However, NASA's budget amounts to roughly 0.5% of that of the US government.

One such accusation involves the IRAS infrared space observatory, launched in 1983. The satellite briefly made headlines due to an "unknown object" that was at first described as "possibly as large as the giant planet Jupiter and possibly so close to Earth that it would be part of this Solar System". This newspaper article has been cited by proponents of the Nibiru cataclysm, beginning with Lieder herself, as evidence for the existence of Nibiru. However, further analysis revealed that of several initially unidentified objects, nine were distant galaxies and the tenth was "galactic cirrus"; none were found to be Solar System bodies.

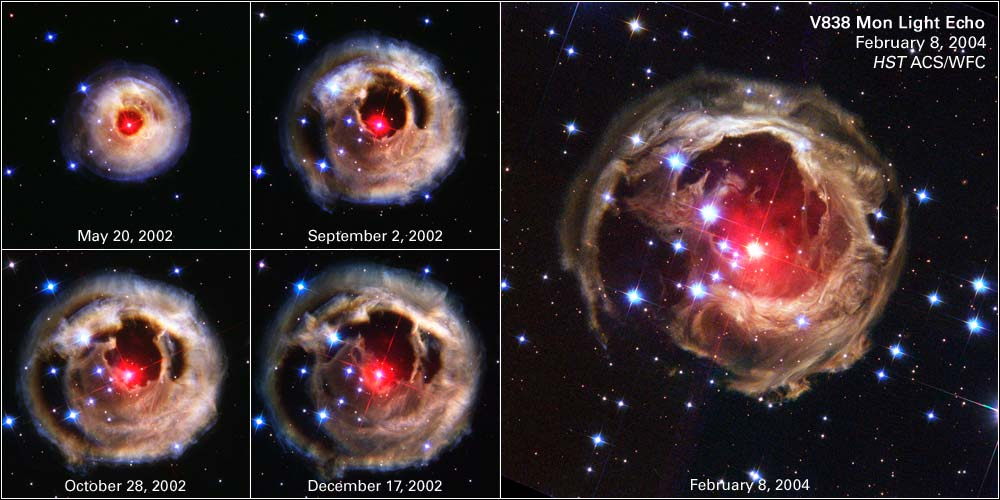
NASA images showing the expansion of a light echo around V838 Mon, between 2002 and 2004

Another accusation made by websites predicting the collision is that the US government built the South Pole Telescope (SPT) to track Nibiru's trajectory, and that the object has been imaged optically. However, the SPT (which is not funded by NASA) is a radio telescope, and cannot take optical images. Its South Pole location was chosen due to the low-humidity environment, and there is no way an approaching object could be seen only from the South Pole. A purported "picture" of Nibiru posted on YouTube was revealed to be a Hubble Space Telescope image of the expanding light echo around the star V838 Mon, which is more than 19,000 light-years away from Earth.

Another conspiracy claim regards a patch of missing data in Google Sky near the constellation of Orion, which has often been cited as evidence that Nibiru has been redacted. However, the same region of sky can still be viewed by thousands of amateur astronomers. A scientist at Google said that the missing data is due to a software error when piecing images together.

Another piece of claimed evidence drawn from Google Sky is the carbon star CW Leonis, which is the brightest object in the 10 μm infrared sky and has been incorrectly claimed to be Nibiru.

== Misappellations ==
Believers in Planet X/Nibiru have given it many names since it was first proposed. All are, in fact, names for other real, hypothetical or imaginary Solar System objects that bear little resemblance either to the planet described by Lieder or to Nibiru as described by Sitchin.

=== Planet X ===
Lieder drew the name Planet X from the hypothetical planet once searched for by astronomers to account for discrepancies in the orbits of Uranus and Neptune. In 1894, Bostonian astronomer Percival Lowell became convinced that the planets Uranus and Neptune had slight discrepancies in their orbits. He concluded that they were being tugged by the gravity of another, more distant planet, which he called "Planet X". However, nearly a century of searching failed to turn up any evidence for such an object (Pluto was initially believed to be Planet X, but was later determined to be too small).

The discrepancies remained through to the 1990s when the astronomer Robert Harrington put forward his hypothesis for an extra planet beyond Neptune with, as one example, a semi-major axis 101.2 AU and eccentricity 0.411 which makes its perihelion 59.60, so the closest to the Sun it would get is one and a half times the distance to Pluto.

Six months before Harrington died of throat cancer in 1992, astronomer E. Myles Standish showed that the supposed discrepancies in the planets' orbits were illusory, the product of overestimating the mass of Neptune. When Neptune's newly determined mass was used in the Jet Propulsion Laboratory Developmental Ephemeris (JPL DE), the supposed discrepancies in the Uranian orbit, and with them the need for a Planet X, vanished. There are no discrepancies in the trajectories of any space probes such as Pioneer 10, Pioneer 11, Voyager 1, and Voyager 2 that can be attributed to the gravitational pull of a large undiscovered object in the outer Solar System. Today astronomers accept that Planet X, as originally defined, does not exist.

=== Hercolubus ===
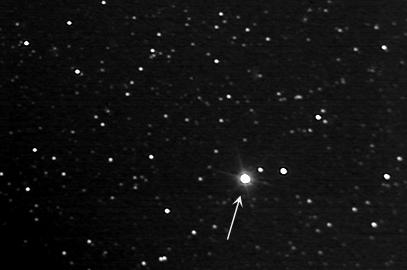
Photograph taken in 2006 showing Barnard's Star, which V. M. Rabolú claimed to actually be the planet Hercolubus

In 1999, New Age author V. M. Rabolú (1926–2000) wrote in Hercolubus or Red Planet that Barnard's Star is actually a planet known to the ancients as Hercolubus, which purportedly came dangerously close to Earth in the past, destroying Atlantis, and will come close to Earth again. Lieder subsequently used Rabolú's ideas to bolster her claims.

Barnard's Star has been directly measured to be 5.98 ly (1.83 pc; 56.6 trillion km). While it is approaching Earth, Barnard's Star will not make its closest approach to the Sun until around AD 11,700, when it will approach to within some 3.8 ly (1.2 pc; 36 trillion km). This is only slightly closer than the closest star to the Sun (Proxima Centauri) lies today.

=== Nemesis ===
Believers in Planet X/Nibiru have often confused it with Nemesis, a hypothetical star first proposed by physicist Richard A. Muller. In 1984, Muller postulated that mass extinctions were not random, but appeared to occur in the fossil record with a loose periodicity that ranged from 26 to 34 million years. He attributed this supposed pattern to a heretofore undetected companion to the Sun, either a dim red dwarf or a brown dwarf, lying in an elliptical, 26-million-year orbit. This object, which he named Nemesis, would, once every 26 million years, pass through the Oort cloud, the shell of over a trillion icy objects believed to be the source of long-period comets that orbit at thousands of times Pluto's distance from the Sun. Nemesis's gravity would then disturb the comets' orbits and send them into the inner Solar System, causing Earth to be bombarded. However, to date no direct evidence of Nemesis has been found. Though the idea of Nemesis appears similar to the Nibiru cataclysm, they are, in fact, very different, as Nemesis, if it existed, would have an orbital period thousands of times longer, and would never come near Earth itself.

=== Sedna or Eris ===
Other people also confuse Nibiru with Sedna (90377 Sedna) or Eris (136199 Eris), trans-Neptunian objects discovered by Mike Brown in 2003 and 2005 respectively. However, despite having been described as a "tenth planet" in an early NASA press release, Eris (then known only as 2003 UB_{313}) is now classified as a dwarf planet. Only slightly more massive than Pluto, Eris has a well-determined orbit that never brings it closer to Earth than 5.5 billion km (3.4 billion mi). Sedna is slightly smaller than Pluto, and never comes closer to Earth than 11.4 billion km (7.1 billion mi). Mike Brown believes the confusion results from both the real Sedna and the imaginary Nibiru having extremely elliptical orbits.

=== Tyche ===
Others have tied it to Tyche, the name proposed by John Matese and Daniel Whitmire of the University of Louisiana at Lafayette for an object they believe to be influencing the orbits of comets in the Oort cloud. In February 2011, Whitmire and his colleagues took their hypothesis to the public in an article in The Independent, in which they named the object "Tyche" and claimed that evidence for its existence would be found once data from the WISE infrared telescope was collated, leading to a spike in calls to astronomers. The name, after the "good sister" of the Greek goddess Nemesis, was chosen to distinguish it from the similar Nemesis hypothesis as, unlike Nemesis, Matese and Whitmire do not believe that their object poses a threat to Earth. Also, this object, if it exists, would, like Nemesis, have an orbit hundreds of times longer than that proposed for Nibiru, and never come near the inner Solar System. In March 2014, NASA announced that the WISE survey had ruled out the existence of Tyche as its proponents had defined it.

=== Comet Elenin ===
Some associated Nibiru with Comet Elenin, a long-period comet discovered by Russian astronomer Leonid Elenin on December 10, 2010. On October 16, 2011, Elenin made its closest approach to Earth at a distance of 0.2338 AU (34,980,000 km; 21,730,000 mi), which is slightly closer than the planet Venus. Nevertheless, in the leadup to its closest approach, claims spread on conspiracy websites concluded that it was on a collision course, that it was as large as Jupiter or even a brown dwarf, and even that the name of the discoverer, Leonid Elenin, was in fact code for ELE, or an Extinction Level Event.

Although the sizes of comets are difficult to determine without close observation, Comet Elenin is likely to be less than 10 km in diameter. Elenin himself estimates that the comet nucleus is roughly 3–4 km in diameter. This would make it millions of times smaller than the supposed Nibiru. Comet hysteria is not uncommon. Attempts have been made to correlate Elenin's alignments with the 2011 Japan earthquake, the 2010 Canterbury earthquake, and 2010 Chile earthquake; however, even discounting Elenin's tiny size, earthquakes are driven by forces within the earth, and cannot be triggered by the passage of nearby objects. In 2011, Leonid Elenin ran a simulation on his blog in which he increased the mass of the comet to that of a brown dwarf (0.05 solar masses). He demonstrated that its gravity would have caused noticeable changes in the orbit of Saturn years before its arrival in the inner Solar System.

In August 2011, Comet Elenin began to disintegrate, and by the time of its closest approach in October 2011 the comet was undetected even by large ground-based telescopes.

=== Comet ISON ===
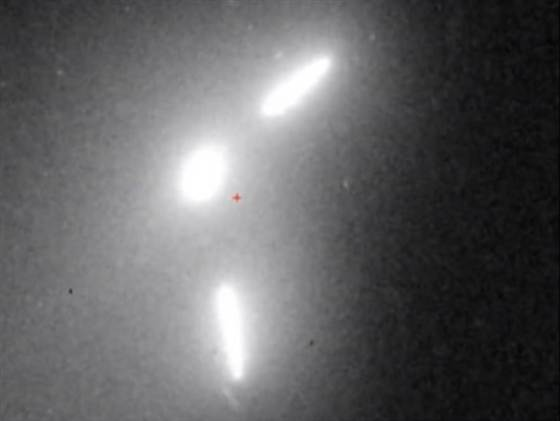
A composite image of Comet ISON, which generated a number of UFO claims

On September 21, 2012, Vitali Nevski and Artyom Novichonok, using the International Scientific Optical Network of telescopes (ISON), discovered the comet C/2012 S1, known as "Comet ISON". Its orbit was expected to bring it within 0.429 AU (64,200,000 km; 39,900,000 mi) of Earth on December 26, 2013. Nonetheless, believers tied it to the Nibiru cataclysm, claiming it would hit Earth on that date, or that it would fragment and pieces of it would hit Earth. Images of the "fragments" of the comet circulating on the Internet were shown to be camera artifacts. On April 30, 2013, the Hubble Space Telescope took three pictures of the comet over the course of 12 hours, which were published as a composite in Hubble's archives. This led to speculation on conspiracy sites that the comet had split into three pieces, or even that it was a UFO. After ISON passed perihelion on November 28, it rapidly began to fade, leaving many to suspect that it had been destroyed as it passed the Sun. While a dim remnant did eventually return round the Sun, it was generally accepted to be a cloud of dust, rather than a solid object. On December 2, 2013, the CIOC (NASA Comet ISON Observing Campaign) officially announced that Comet ISON had fully disintegrated. The Hubble Space Telescope failed to detect fragments of ISON on December 18, 2013. On May 8, 2014, a detailed examination of the comet disintegration was published, suggesting that the comet fully disintegrated hours before perihelion.

=== Planet Nine ===
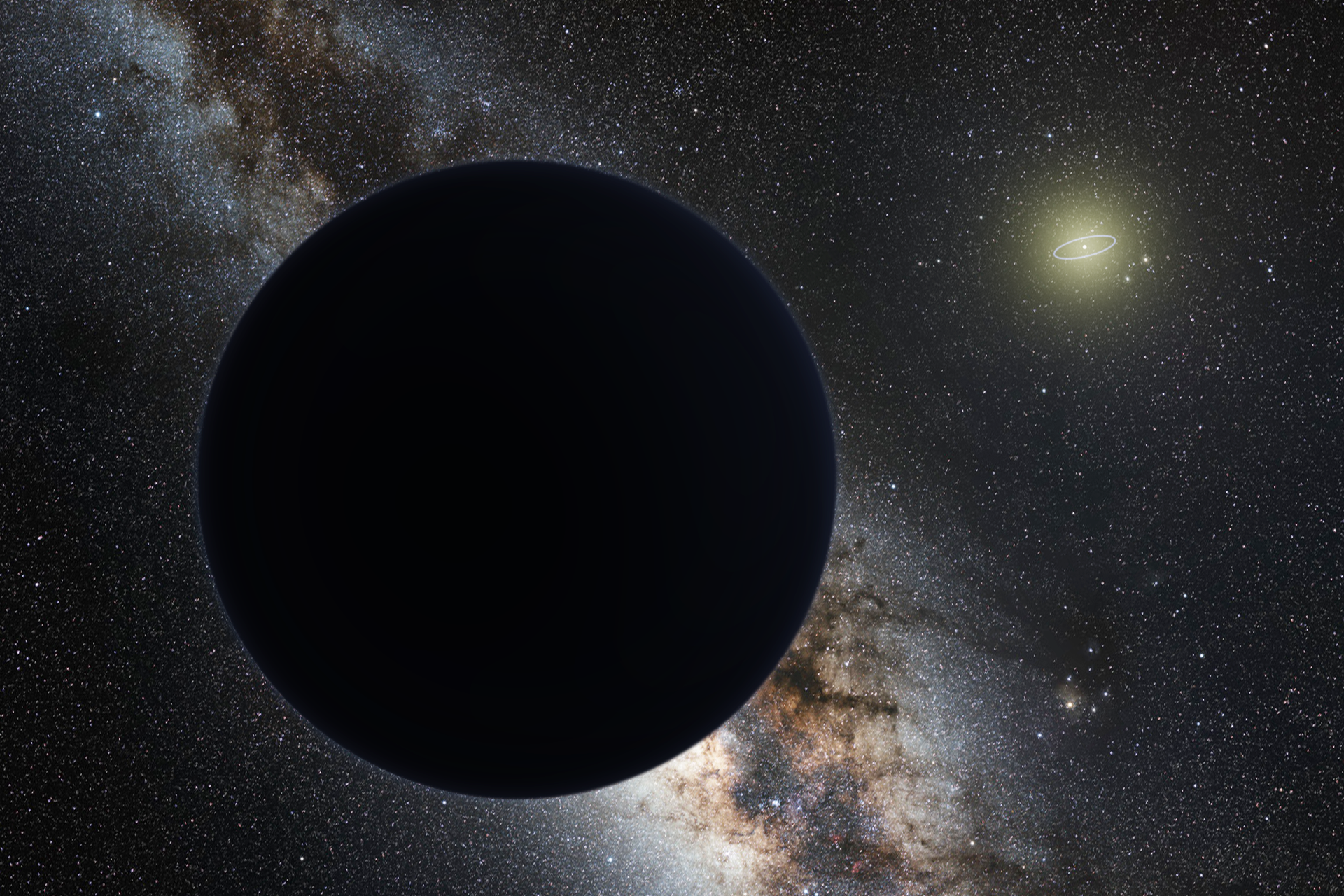
Artist's impression of the hypothetical Planet Nine as an ice giant eclipsing the central Milky Way, with the Sun in the distance. Neptune's orbit is shown as a small ellipse around the Sun. (See labeled version.)

In March 2014, astronomers Chad Trujillo and Scott Sheppard published a paper in Nature arguing that the apparent clustering of the arguments of perihelion of distant trans-Neptunian objects suggested the existence of a large trans-Neptunian planet. On January 20, 2016, Mike Brown and Konstantin Batygin announced that they had corroborated Trujillo and Sheppard's findings, and that they believed the planet, which they dubbed "Planet Nine", would have a mass roughly ten times that of Earth, and a semimajor axis of approximately 400–1500 AU (60–225 billion km). Believers in Nibiru and the Nibiru cataclysm immediately argued that this constituted evidence for their claims. However, astronomers pointed out that this planet, if it exists, would have a perihelion of roughly 200 AU (30 billion km).

In March 2016, the Monthly Notices of the Royal Astronomical Society published a paper by Daniel Whitmire (who had proposed the existence of Tyche) in which he reconsidered a modified version of the Nemesis model he had first proposed in 1985 due to recent speculations concerning the possibility of a trans-Neptunian planet. The hypothesis argues that an object far closer to the Sun than Nemesis could have a similar effect if its orbit precessed at a rate thousands of times slower than its actual speed, which would mean it might only interact with the Kuiper belt every 27 million years, potentially sending comets into the inner Solar System and triggering mass extinctions. However, the paper had been initially published online in November 2015, before Brown and Batygin went public with Planet Nine, and concerns a different object far closer to the Sun (100 AU vs. ~600 AU); Planet Nine, if it exists, is too far away, says Brown, to have such an effect on the Kuiper belt. Nonetheless, an article in the British tabloid The Sun (later republished in the New York Post) conflated the three ideas of Nibiru, Planet Nine, and Whitmire's planet to suggest that not only had Planet Nine been found, but that it would collide with Earth at the end of April, which resulted in Batygin receiving a spike in panicked calls. In October 2017, science writer Pat Brennan wrote that this planet has no chance of ever colliding with Earth.

== Public reaction ==
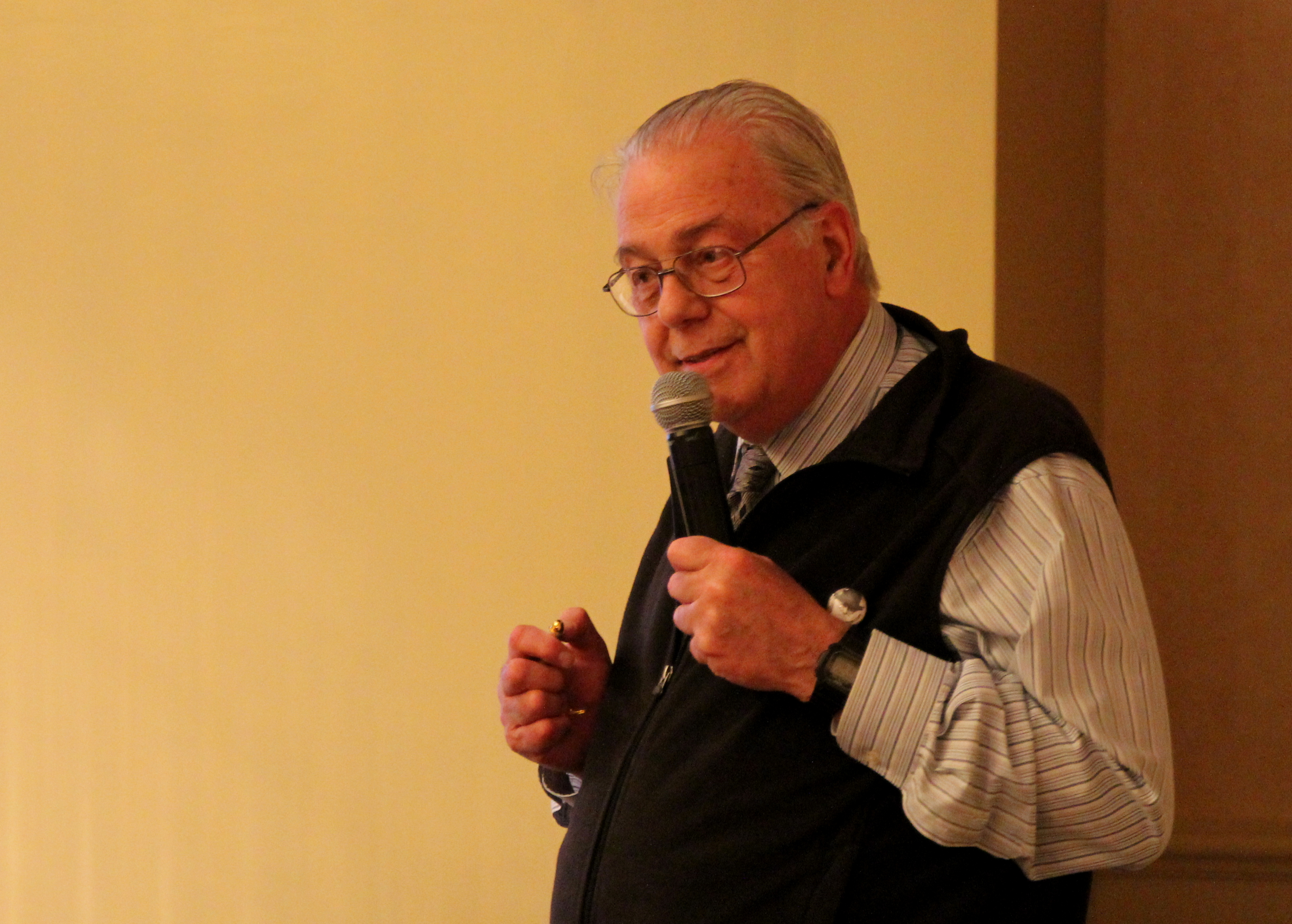
Astronomer David Morrison has repeatedly debunked the claims of Nibiru cataclysm supporters.

The impact of the public fear of the Nibiru cataclysm has been especially felt by professional astronomers. In 2008, Mike Brown said that Nibiru was the most common pseudoscientific topic he was asked about.

Before his retirement after 2012, David Morrison, director of the SETI Institute, CSI Fellow and Senior Scientist at NASA's Astrobiology Institute at Ames Research Center, said he received 20 to 25 emails a week about the impending arrival of Nibiru: some frightened, others angry and naming him as part of the conspiracy to keep the truth of the impending apocalypse from the public, and still others asking whether or not they should kill themselves, their children or their pets. Half of these emails were from outside the US. Science writer Govert Schilling noted, "Planetary scientists are being driven to distraction by Nibiru. ... And it is not surprising; you devote so much time, energy and creativity to fascinating scientific research, and find yourself on the tracks of the most amazing and interesting things, and all the public at large is concerned about is some crackpot theory about clay tablets, god-astronauts and a planet that doesn't exist." Similarly, Professor Brian Cox posted on Twitter in 2012 that, "If anyone else asks me about 'Nibiru' the imaginary bullshit planet I will slap them around their irrational heads with Newton's Principia".

NASA frequently has to evaluate whether or not to respond to such claims, and the value of reassuring the public is outweighed by the risk of granting further exposure to a completely non-scientific idea. Prior to the 2012 date, Morrison stated that he hoped that the non-arrival of Nibiru could serve as a teaching moment for the public, instructing them on "rational thought and baloney detection", but doubted that would happen. During the 2017 revival, Morrison stated that the Nibiru phenomenon "keeps popping up over and over" despite his original assumption that it would be short-lived.

Morrison noted in a lecture recorded on FORA.tv that there was a huge disconnect between the large number of people on the Internet who believed in Nibiru's arrival and the majority of scientists who have never heard of it. To date he is the only major NASA scientist to speak out regularly against the Nibiru phenomenon.

== Cultural influence ==
A viral marketing campaign for Sony Pictures' 2009 film 2012, directed by Roland Emmerich, which depicts the end of the world in the year 2012, featured a supposed warning from the "Institute for Human Continuity" that listed the arrival of Planet X as one of its doomsday scenarios. Mike Brown attributed a spike in concerned emails and phone calls he received from the public to this site.

Danish filmmaker Lars von Trier drew inspiration from Nibiru for his 2011 apocalyptic film Melancholia.

A planet named "Nibiru" made a cameo appearance in the 2013 film Star Trek Into Darkness, which was connected to the cataclysm in the press.

Nibiru was a long-running story arc in Scooby-Doo! Mystery Incorporated, ultimately revealed to be a periodic planetary alignment which allowed extradimensional Anunnaki to cross over to Earth and would allow an evil member of their kind in the 21st century to destroy Earth's universe.

The Yu-Gi-Oh! Monster Card "Nibiru, the Primal Being" depicts a massive, asteroid-like object hurtling towards a planet that looks like Earth.

== See also ==
- List of topics characterized as pseudoscience
- Theia (hypothetical planet)
