= Spirtle =

Spirtle may refer to:

- Spirtle Rock, a columnar land feature in Scotland
- Spurtle, a (typically Scottish) paddle or stick for stirring porridge
