= National Observatory (Brazil) =

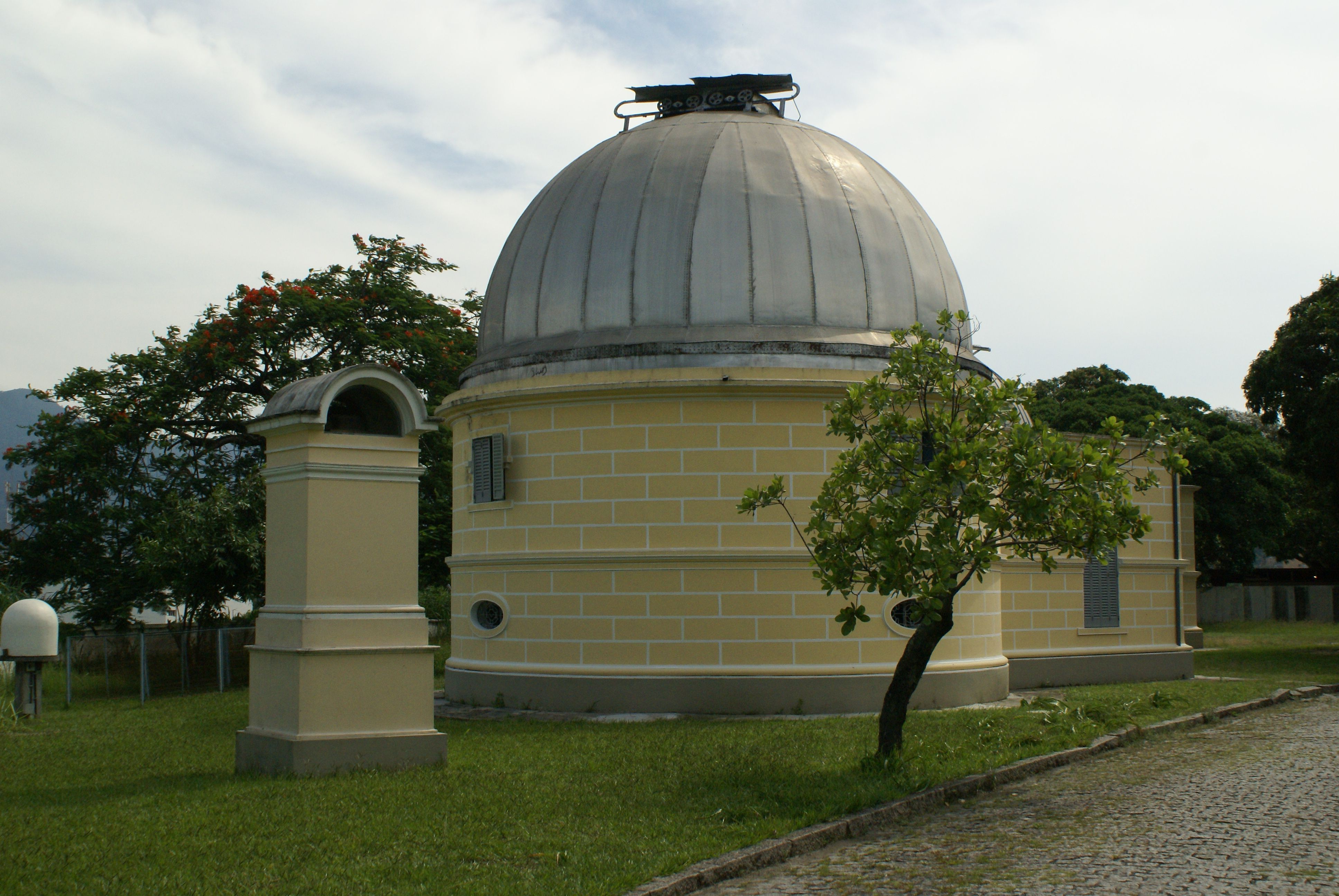
- Alternative names: Observatório Nacional Ministério da Ciência
- Organization: Ministry of Science, Technology and Innovation
- Observatory code: 880
- Location: Rio de Janeiro, RJ, Brazil
- Coordinates: 22.8953°S 43.2246°W
- Established: 15 October 1827; 198 years ago
- Website: on.br
- Related media on Commons

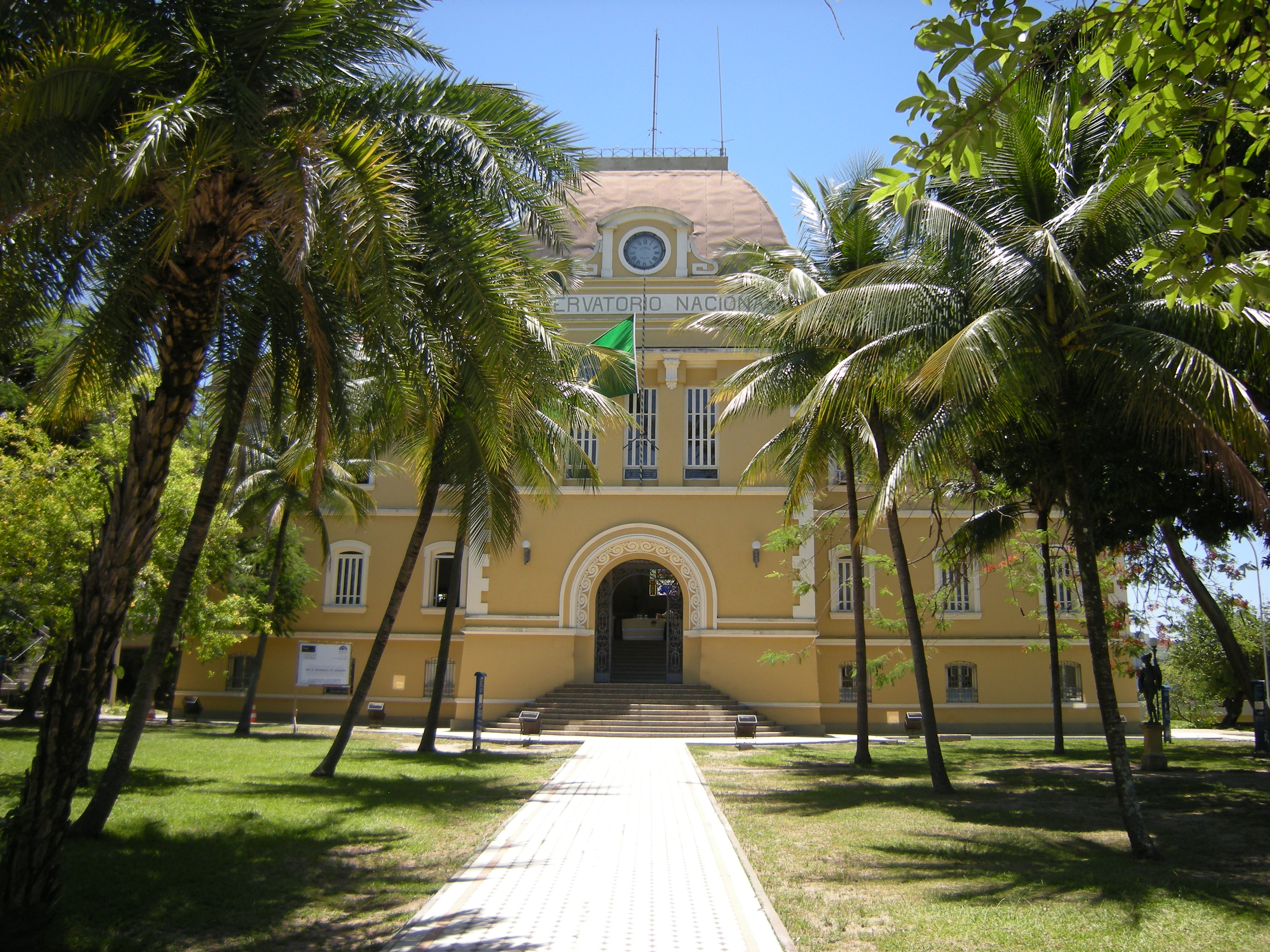
Building of Museu de Astronomia e Ciências Afins at the National Observatory

The National Observatory (Portuguese: Observatório Nacional or ON) is an institution localized in Rio de Janeiro, Brazil. Founded by Pedro I on October 15, 1827, it is one of the oldest scientific institutions in the country. Its initial purpose was to guide the geographic studies of Brazil and teaching navigation.

The institute is responsible for the Brazilian Official Time and performs various researches and studies in astronomy, astrophysics and geophysics. It offers postgraduate courses leading to master's and doctorate degree.

== History ==
There has been astronomical observation in Brazil since the colonial times. According to Serafim Leite, the Jesuits installed an observatory in his school in Castle Hill in the Rio de Janeiro in 1730. In the same place, in 1780, Portuguese astronomers Sanches d'Orta and Oliveira Barbosa set up an observatory and began to perform regular observations of astronomy, meteorology and terrestrial magnetism. With the transfer of the Portuguese court to Brazil in 1808, the collection of this observatory was transferred to the Royal Military Academy.

On September 27, 1827, the General Assembly Legislative Empire, authorized the government to create an Astronomical Observatory under the Ministry of the Empire, and October 15, 1827, the Emperor D. Pedro I decreed its creation. He was installed in the tower of the Military School, and was directed initially by professor of mathematics Pedro de Alcântara Bellegarde. In 1845 the Minister of War, Francisco Jeronimo Coelho, reorganized the institution as Imperial Observatory of Rio de Janeiro, when he assumed the position of Director, Professor Soulier Sauve, Military School, who moved to the fortress of Conception, and, in 1846, had its first Regulation approved by decree.

Between 1846 and 1850, the Director of the Observatory Soulier moved again, this time to the former premises of a church in Castle Hill, where he remained until 1920 After the death of Soulier in 1850, Lieutenant Colonel Engineer Antonio Manoel de Mello, also a professor at the Military Academy, was named director, remaining in office until 1865, when it was replaced by Lieutenant Commander Anthony Joaquim Cruvelo d'Avila. That same year, the Observatory became subordinate Central School, which was spun off from Military School, remaining in that condition until 1871, when the Administrative Commission of the Imperial Observatory of Rio de Janeiro was created. It was named for the French scientist Emmanuel direction Liais, remaining in her direction by two management periods, from January to July 1871 and from 1874 to 1881 Between 1871 and 1874, Maria Camilo Ferreira Armond, Viscount Meadows, was ahead direction.

Between 1827 and 1871, the Observatory has been almost exclusively focused on the education of students of military schools land and sea. In the year 1871, was removed from the military umbrella and reorganized to devote himself exclusively to research, and service to society in the fields of meteorology, astronomy, geophysics, and the measurement of time and the determination of time. The Belgian astronomer and military engineer Luis Cruls Liais succeeded in 1881, remaining in office until 1908 In 1888, Parliament approved funding to begin construction of the new Observatory in the Imperial Treasury of Santa Cruz, but the next year the proclamation of the Republic, the Observatory was again under the Ministry of War and had its name changed to the Rio de Janeiro Observatory, to which is annexed the Geographical Service. It was then abandoned the idea of his move to Santa Cruz. After the death of Cruls, in 1908, astronomer Henry Charles Morize took over. In 1909, through Decree 7.672 of November 18, was created in the Ministry of Agriculture, the Department of meteorology and astronomy, which was placed under the National Observatory and was extinguished Observatory of Rio de Janeiro.

On September 28, 1913, was signed the Minutes of the foundation stone of the new National Observatory on the Colina de São Januário (Hill of São Januário), in Rio de Janeiro. In 1915, we implemented the Magnetic Observatory Brooms in Rio de Janeiro, today integrated into the structure of ON. In 1921, Directorate of Meteorology had separated the two areas that composed it, giving rise to two institutes: one devoted to meteorology, called Directorate of Meteorology, and another to astronomy, geophysics and metrology, which retained the name National Observatory. That year, he received a visit from Albert Einstein, during his stay in Brazil. In 1922, the NB was transferred from Castle Hill, current Esplanada do Castelo, to the Hill of São Januário, in Saint Kitts, where he currently is still installed. It was the end of a demand initiated by Liais, fifty years before, adequate facilities for the Observatory.

In 1930, the National Observatory became part of the newly created Ministry of Education and Culture (MEC). In 1955, ON broadened its research in terrestrial magnetism with running an observatory on the island of Tatuoca at the mouth of the Amazonas River.

In 1972, FINEP approved a project to install an astrophysical observatory, to be installed in Brasópolis, Minas Gerais. On April 22, 1980 was already installed and starting operations one cassegrain-reflector coudé of 1.60 meters (diameter of the main mirror). In February 1981, JA de Freitas Pacheco, director of ON, opened a site under the name Brazilian Astrophysical Observatory (OAB). On March 13, 1985, the OAB was dismembered from ON, giving rise to the current National Laboratory for Astrophysics (LNA).

In 2003 was inaugurated the new premises of ON's Service Time, in Building Carlos Lacombe campus. In May 2004, ON started another service, the Time Stamp.

== Notable discoveries and research ==
In January, 1997, astronomer Duília de Mello discovered SN 1997D, a peculiar type-II supernova.

== Division of Hour Services ==
The National Observatory Division of Hour Services (DSO in Portuguese) is, according to Brazilian law, the only institution designated to generate, keep and disseminate the Brazilian Legal Time. The DSO operates the PPE radio station, broadcasting Brazilian legal time on the frequencies 10 MHz, 166.53 MHz and 171.13 MHz.

== See also ==
- List of astronomical observatories
