= Anagram Islands =

Group of islands in Antarctica

- Location within Antarctica

Geography
- Location: Antarctica
- Coordinates: 65°12′S 64°20′W
- Archipelago: Wilhelm Archipelago

Administration
- Administered under the Antarctic Treaty System

Demographics
- Population: Uninhabited

The Anagram Islands (65°12′S 64°20′W) are a group of small islands and rocks lying between the Roca Islands and the Argentine Islands, in the Wilhelm Archipelago, Antarctica.

== Location ==
Graham Coast, Antarctic Peninsula. Anagram Islands near the east end

The islands are off the Graham Coast of the Antarctic Peninsula. The French Passage lies between the Vedel Islands to the northeast and the islands that include the Anagram Islands to the southwest. The Betbeder Islands are to the west and the Berthelot Islands to the southeast.

== Exploration and name ==
The area was charted by the Belgian Antarctic Expedition (BelgAE) under Adrien de Gerlache, 1897–99, the French Antarctic Expedition (FrAE) under Jean-Baptiste Charcot, 1903–05 and 1908–10, and the British Graham Land expedition (BGLE) under John Rymill, 1934–37. The names Argentine, Roca and Cruls were variously applied to the four island groups on the south side of French Passage. The islands were mapped in detail by the Falkland Islands Dependencies Survey (FIDS) from photographs taken from the helicopter of HMS Protector and from information obtained by the British Naval Hydrographic Survey Unit in 1958, and the three names positioned as originally given by the Belgian and French expeditions. The remaining island group was named Anagram Islands by the UK Antarctic Place-Names Committee (UK-APC) in 1959, anagram meaning a transposition of parts.

== Features ==
=== Nob Island ===
65°12′S 64°19′W. The largest of the Anagram Islands. So named by the UK-APC in 1961 because there is a black knob of rock, almost permanently snow free, on the north side of the island which is a useful navigational mark for vessels using French Passage. Nob is a spelling of knob.

=== Maranga Island ===
65°12′S 64°22′W. The westernmost of the Anagram Islands. Named by the UK-APC in 1961. "Maranga" is an anagram of the name Anagram.

=== Spirtle Rock ===
65°13′S 64°20′W. A rock awash in the navigable passage between The Barchans [in the Argentine Islands] and the Anagram Islands. The descriptive name was recommended by UK-APC in 1971. "Spirtle" means to cause to splash.

== Sources ==
- Alberts, Fred G., ed. (1995), Geographic Names of the Antarctic (PDF) (2 ed.), United States Board on Geographic Names This article incorporates public domain material from websites or documents of the United States Board on Geographic Names.
- Graham Land and South Shetland Islands, BAS: British Antarctic Survey, 2005
