= Bradley Rock =

Rock

- Location within Antarctica

Geography
- Location: Antarctica
- Coordinates: 65°1′S 64°42′W
- Archipelago: Wilhelm Archipelago

Administration
- Administered under the Antarctic Treaty System

Demographics
- Population: Uninhabited

Bradley Rock is an isolated rock which lies about 17 km (9 nmi) northwest of the entrance to French Passage in the Wilhelm Archipelago. It was named by the UK Antarctic Place-Names Committee (1973) for Lieutenant Commander Edgar M. Bradley, Royal Navy, who directed a hydrographic survey in the area in 1965.
