= French Passage =

Strait in Antarctica

French Passage (65°10′S 64°20′W) is a passage through the Wilhelm Archipelago, extending in a northwest–southeast direction between Petermann Island, the Stray Islands, the Vedel Islands and the Myriad Islands to the north and the Argentine Islands, the Anagram Islands, the Roca Islands, and the Cruls Islands to the south. It was so named by the British Graham Land Expedition, 1934–37, because the passage was navigated for the first time in 1909 by the Pourquoi-Pas?, the ship of the French Antarctic Expedition under Jean-Baptiste Charcot. Bradley Rock is an isolated rock which lies about 9 nautical miles (17 km) northwest of the entrance to French Passage.
