= Cruls (crater) =

Crater on Mars

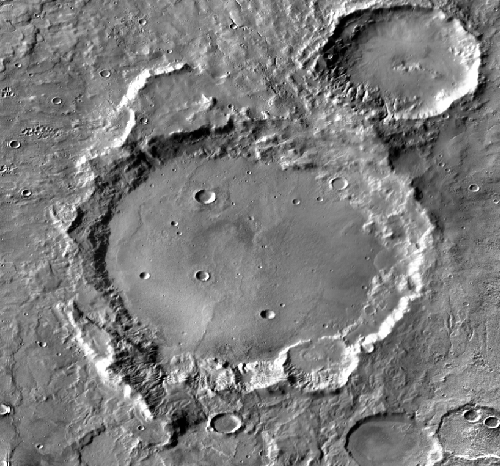
- Martian impact crater Cruls based on Mars Odyssey Orbiter THEMIS IR image.
- Planet: Mars
- Coordinates: 42.91°S 163.03°E
- Quadrangle: Eridania
- Diameter: 87.89 km
- Eponym: Luís Cruls, Brazilian astronomer.

Cruls is an impact crater in the Eridania quadrangle on Mars at 42.91° S and 163.03° E. and is 87.89 km in diameter. Its name was assigned in 1973 by the International Astronomical Union, in honor of Brazilian astronomer Luís Cruls. Evidence of previous glacial activity is evident in images.

== Glacial Features ==
Glaciers, loosely defined as patches of currently or recently flowing ice, are thought to be present across large but restricted areas of the modern Martian surface, and are inferred to have been more widely distributed at times in the past.

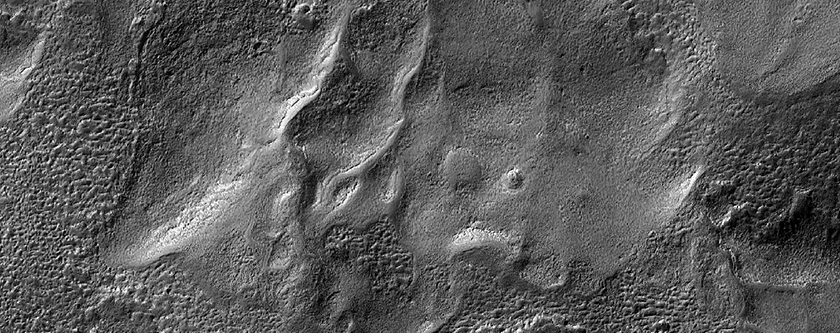
Close-up of Glacial Flow Features in Cruls Crater, HiRISE, Mars Reconnaissance Orbiter

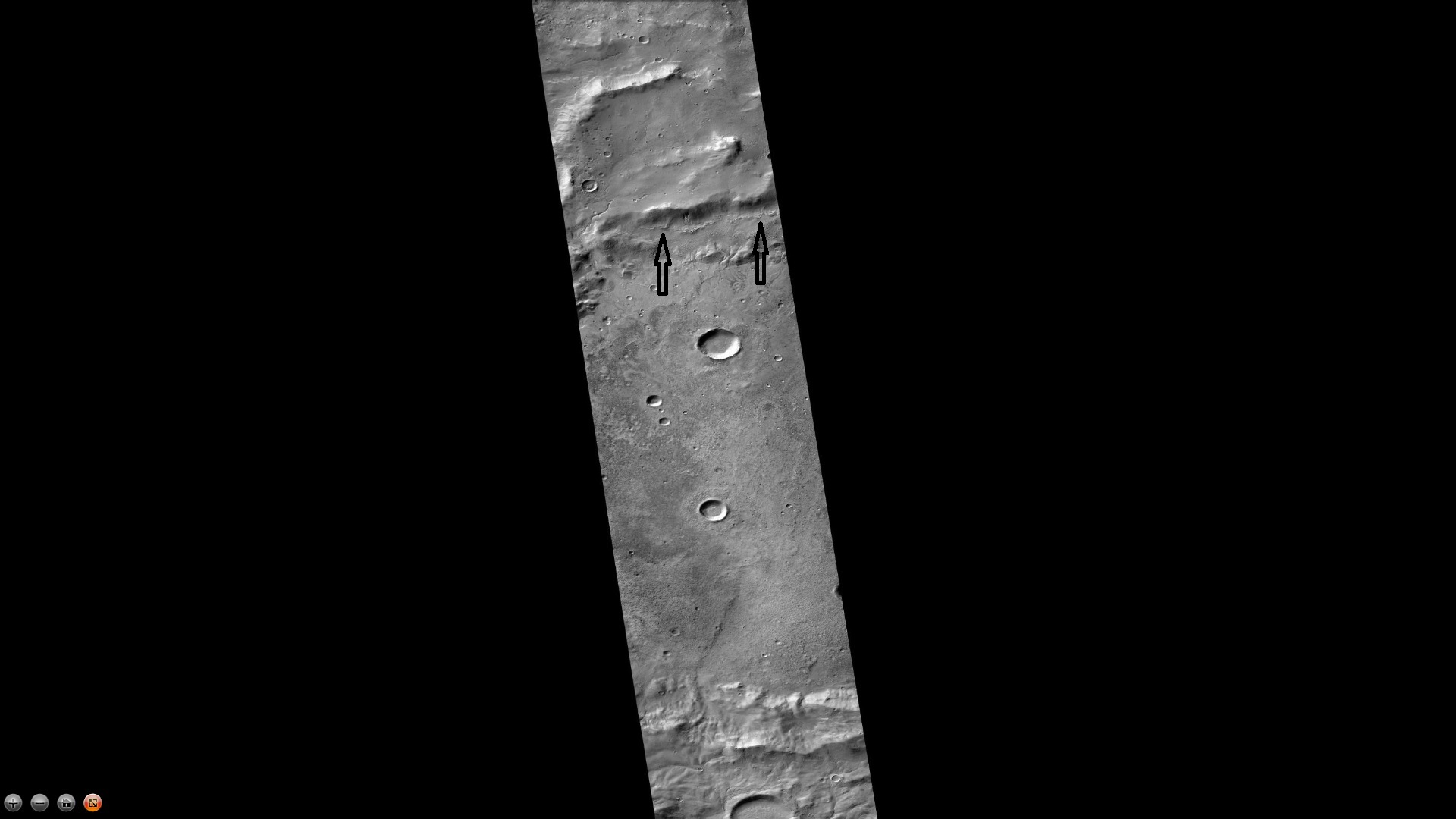
Cruls Crater, as seen by CTX camera (on Mars Reconnaissance Orbiter). Arrows indicate old glaciers.

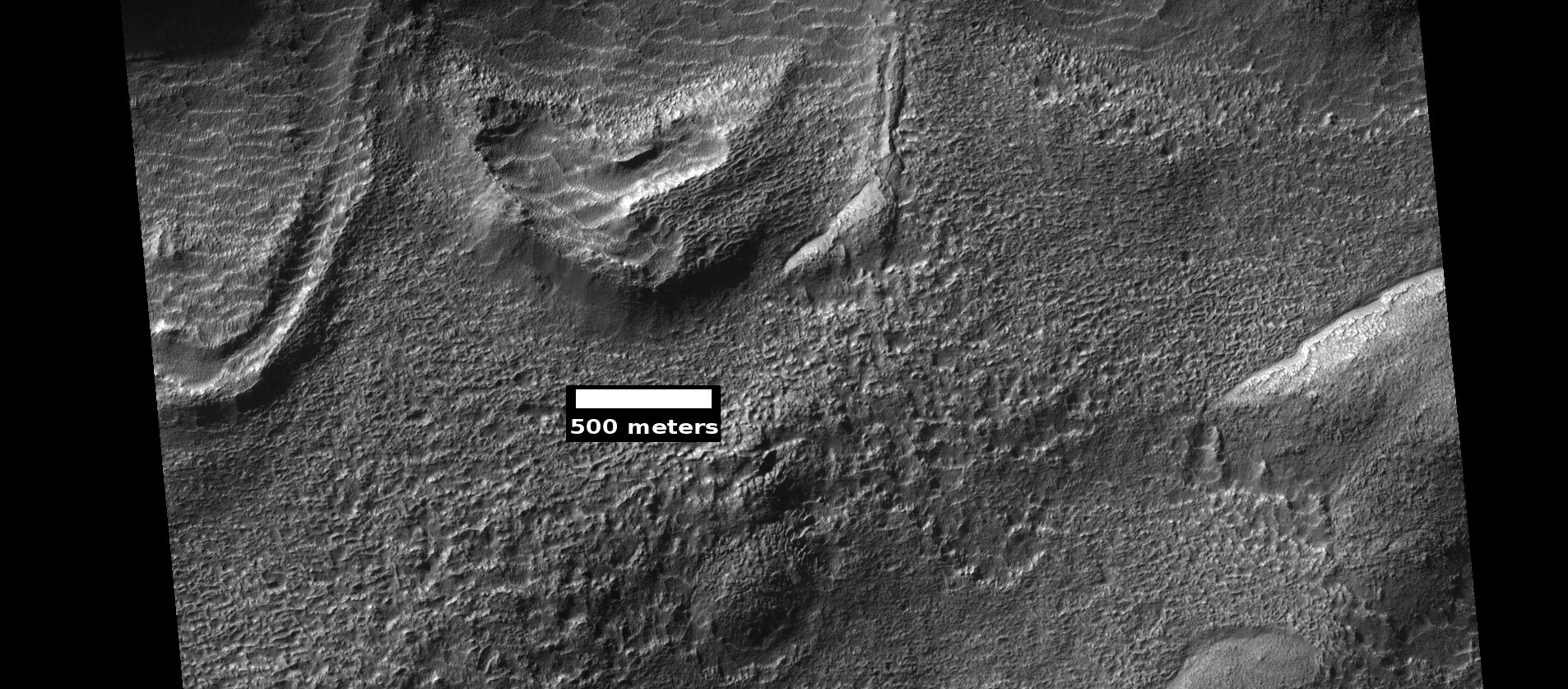
Old glaciers in Cruls Crater, as seen by HiRISE under HiWish program.

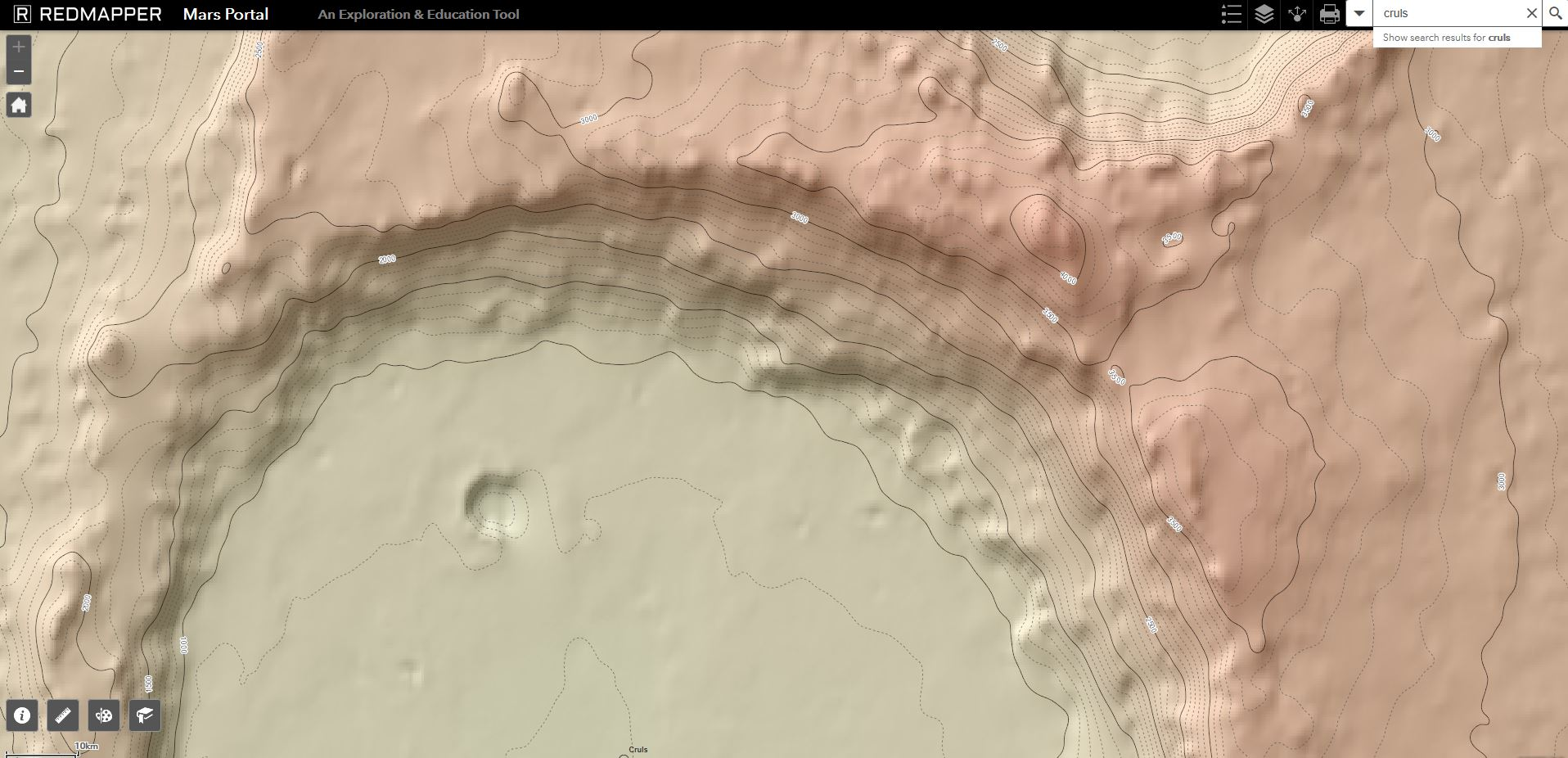
This topographic map was created using Mars Orbiter Laser Altimeter (MOLA) technology on the Mars Global Surveyor spacecraft. This image is a screenshot of RedMapper's website and shows the north rim of Cruls crater.

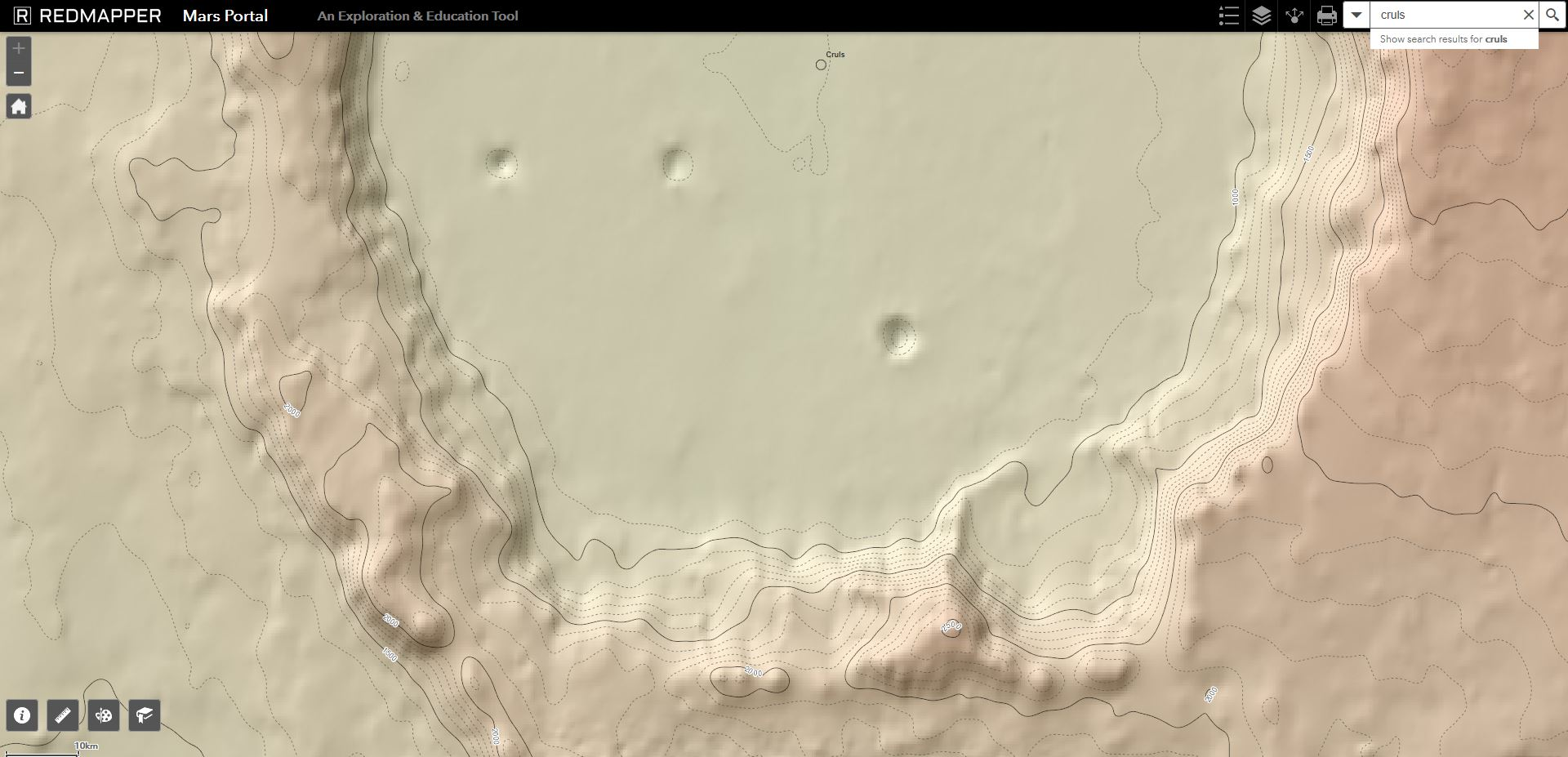
This topographic map was created using Mars Orbiter Laser Altimeter (MOLA) technology on the Mars Global Surveyor spacecraft. This image is a screenshot of RedMapper's website and shows the south rim of Cruls crater.

== See also ==
- List of craters on Mars
