= James David Manning =

American clergyman

- Born: February 20, 1947 (age 79); Red Springs, North Carolina, U.S.
- Education: Union Theological Seminary (MDiv)
- Occupation: Pastor
- Organization: ATLAH World Missionary Church
- Spouse: Elizabeth Sarah Manning
- Website: atlah.org

James David Manning (born February 20, 1947) is an American pastor at the ATLAH World Missionary Church. Manning grew up in Red Springs, North Carolina, and has been with ATLAH since 1981. ATLAH stands for All The Land Anointed Holy, which is Manning's name for Harlem.

== Biography ==
James David Manning was born on February 20, 1947, in Red Springs, North Carolina. He grew up in the town, which was then segregated. He picked cotton and pulled tobacco as a child, then took a bus to New York the day he graduated from high school. He worked as a marketing representative for Procter & Gamble. He became radicalized in the 1960s and said he was driven by his hatred of white people. As a younger man, Manning burglarized homes, mostly on Long Island. Between 1969 and 1974, he said he broke into as many as 100 houses and once threatened an associate with a loaded shotgun. He spent about 3 1/2 years in prison in New York and Florida for burglary, robbery, larceny, criminal possession of a weapon, and other charges before his release in 1978. While in prison, he became a devout Christian.

He became the pastor of Bethelite Missionary Baptist Church several years after his prison term. After beginning study in 1982, Manning graduated from Union Theological Seminary in the City of New York, from which he was awarded a Master of Divinity in 1985. In 1991, he changed his church's name to ATLAH, an acronym for "All the Land Anointed Holy".

=== Taxation controversies ===
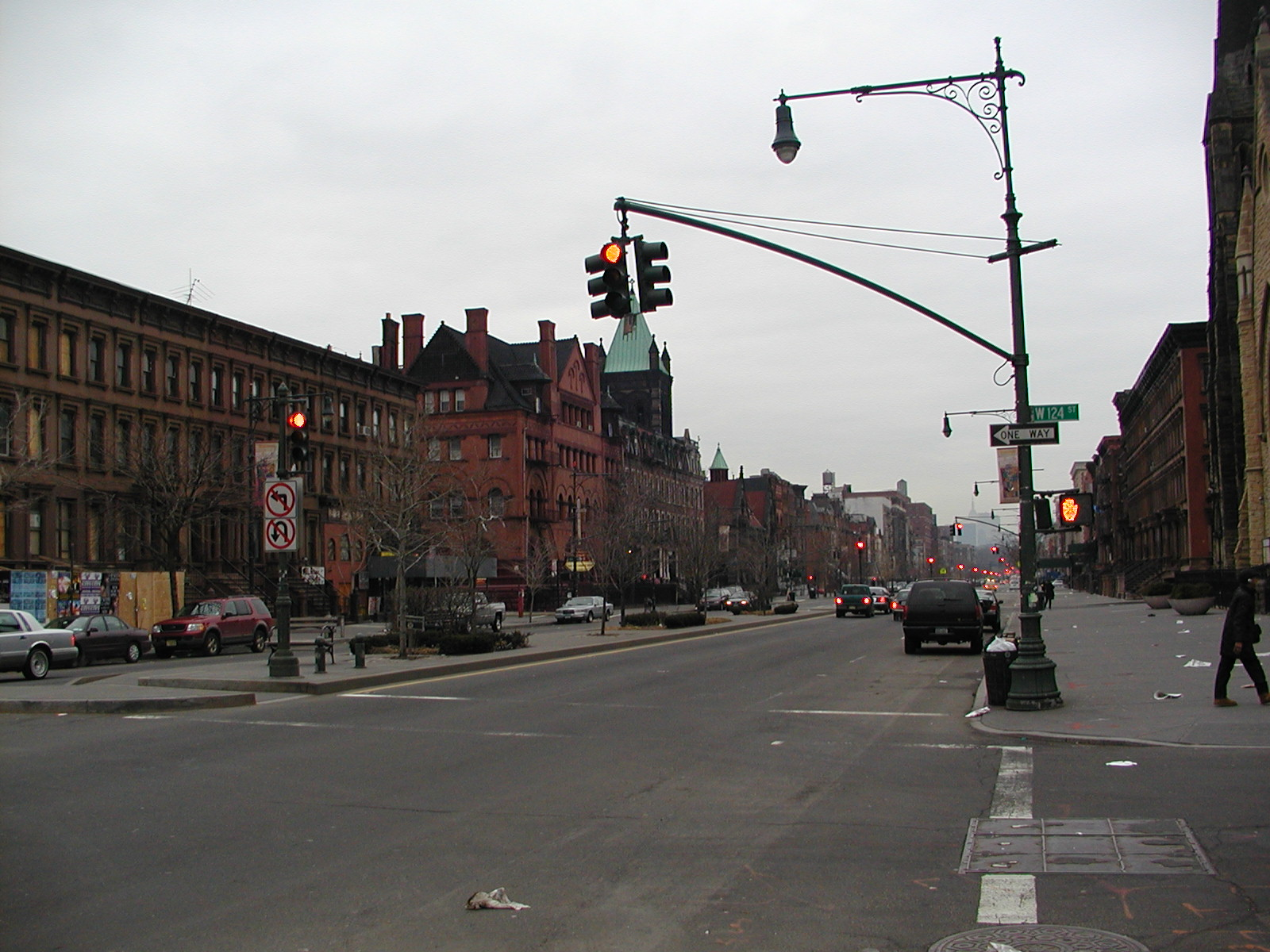
Atlah Worldwide Missionary Church seen from the corner of West 124th Street and Lenox Avenue, Harlem

New York City authorities claimed in 2016 that ATLAH owed $1.02 million in unpaid taxes and water bills. In 2016, the church was due to be sold at a public auction, and the Ali Forney Center, a nonprofit organization providing transitional homes for homeless LGBTQ youth, raised $200 thousand to purchase it. In September 2016, a judge vacated the foreclosure and sale order, ruling the property cannot be forced to be sold until such time that ATLAH is found to actually owe the taxes the city claims it owes. After the court ruling, Manning threatened to publicly burn the rainbow flag as a celebration, which caused the Ali Forney Center to organize a protest outside the church. The case remained in the courts as of 2019.

== Views ==
=== Homosexuality ===
Manning has received some media coverage for his condemnations of homosexuality, which include what a blog claimed was a sign outside the church sharing “Jesus would stone homos.” Manning's views on homosexuality include the beliefs that "white homos are going to take the black woman's man". He calls for Harlem to be a "homo-free zone."

In an interview with The Huffington Post, Manning stated, "The homosexual activists are flat-out lying about what Jesus would do regarding the detestable, abominable, diseased practice and act of homosexuality. They have been lying and saying that Jesus would simply love." Manning also stated Starbucks will be "ground zero for spreading Ebola" in the United States because homosexuals frequent the stores and "a lot of bodily fluids" are exchanged. Manning has also stated that Starbucks puts semen in its coffees, and that millions of people around the world "really think that the taste of semen is quite a flavor."

He admitted during an interview with The Young Turks that without his deep faith, he would have already given in to the "sodomitical temptations", as he calls homosexuals "sodomites", which he claims is the biblically correct term.

=== Barack Obama ===
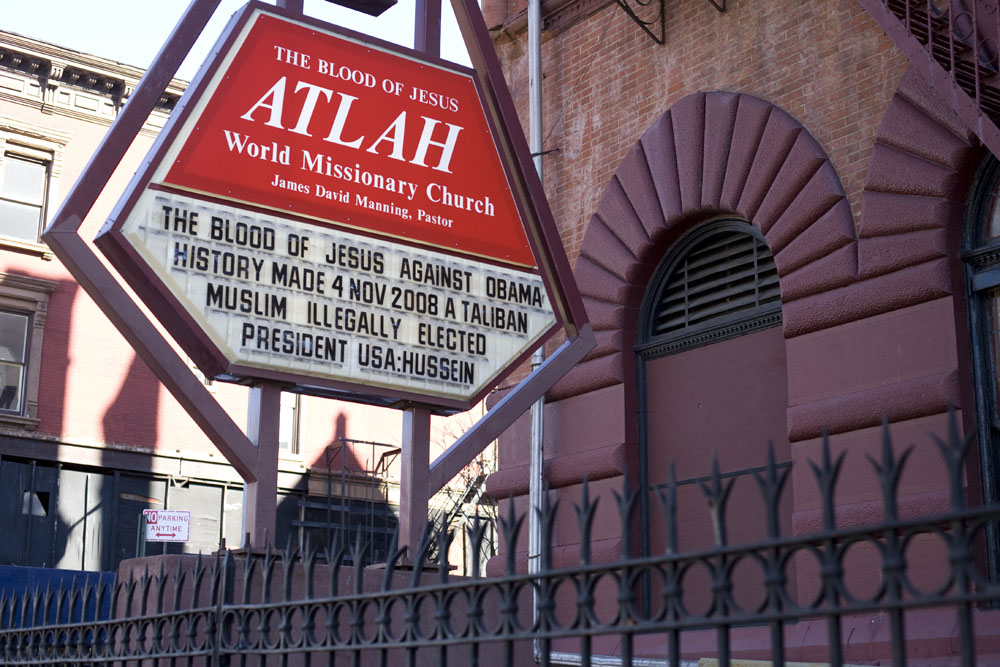
Sign outside ATLAH Church describing President Obama as a "Taliban Muslim"

Manning came to public attention during the 2008 presidential election after ATLAH posted several sermons of his on YouTube that were harshly critical of Obama. Among other accusations, he called Obama's mother "white trash" for becoming pregnant by a black man out of wedlock, an issue he discussed during a press conference at the National Press Club on December 8, 2008.

It is common knowledge that African men, coming from the continent of Africa — especially for the first time — do diligently seek out white women to have sexual intercourse with. Generally the most noble of white society choose not to intercourse sexually with these men. So it's usually the trashier ones who make their determinations that they're going to have sex.

Manning defended his sermons in an interview on Fox News, saying, "We also have to talk about his character." The sermons drew the attention of Americans United for Separation of Church and State, which filed a complaint with the Internal Revenue Service objecting to alleged violations of laws granting tax-free status to churches on the condition that they refrain from certain forms of political activity.

Manning continued his criticisms of Obama after his election, frequently calling him a criminal and "long-legged mack daddy." He produced a video in summer 2009 in which he predicted that there would be a white backlash against Obama, complete with riots, and he attended one of the first "birther" events. In an interview with the Israeli radio station Arutz Sheva, Manning asserted that Obama had chosen to befriend Muslims instead of Jews; he also offered praise of Meir Kahane.

In May 2010, Manning staged a show trial of Barack Obama at ATLAH for wire fraud, with Manning acting as prosecutor. Although the treason and sedition charges had been deleted from consideration at the trial, Manning expressed the opinion that Obama should be hanged. On August 4, 2014, he prognosticated that Vladimir Putin would "out" Obama as gay within 100 days.

=== Black leadership ===
In his sermons and in video messages posted on his church's website and on YouTube, Manning has denounced the influence of Charles Rangel, Al Sharpton, Cornel West, and Jay-Z. He has also had harsh words for black people in general, and black men in particular.

He claimed in a 2015 sermon that black people had a long history of not achieving many significant advancements or improvements for themselves, and named South Africa as an example after what he said was a deterioration in living standards in the county after Nelson Mandela came to power.

=== Gentrification in Harlem ===
Manning is fiercely opposed to the gentrification of Harlem and calls for its residents to boycott its shops, restaurants, doctors, banks, and churches. That action, combined with a general rent strike, would force all property owners out of Harlem, he said, leaving the neighborhood to its rightful inheritors: black people. Manning said the intent of the boycott was to return Harlem to its pre-gentrification days of 1990, without the crack cocaine, crime, and boarded-up buildings. His hope, he says, is that declining property values will make housing affordable for black people.

Manning calls his plan "No Dew, Nor Rain", after Elijah's warning to Ahab, king of Israel, of a coming drought. "When there's no dew, no rain, there's a drought — there's all kinds of suffering", Manning said. The whole of Harlem, he said, is to be a "drought zone".
