= Roca Islands =

Group of islands in the Wilhelm Archipelago, Antarctica

Location of the Roca Islands

Roca Islands (65°11′S 64°27′W) is a group of small islands between Cruls Islands and Anagram Islands on the south side of French Passage in the Wilhelm Archipelago. Discovered by the French Antarctic Expedition, 1903–05, and named by Charcot for Julio A. Roca, President of Argentina, 1880–86 and 1898–1904. The name was incorrectly applied to the Anagram Islands by the British Graham Land Expedition (BGLE), 1934–37, but was reidentified with this group after further mapping by the British Naval Hydrographic Survey Unit in 1958.

== See also ==
- List of Antarctic and sub-Antarctic islands
