= ATLAH World Missionary Church =

Church in Manhattan, New York

Coordinates: 40.8062°N 73.9462°W

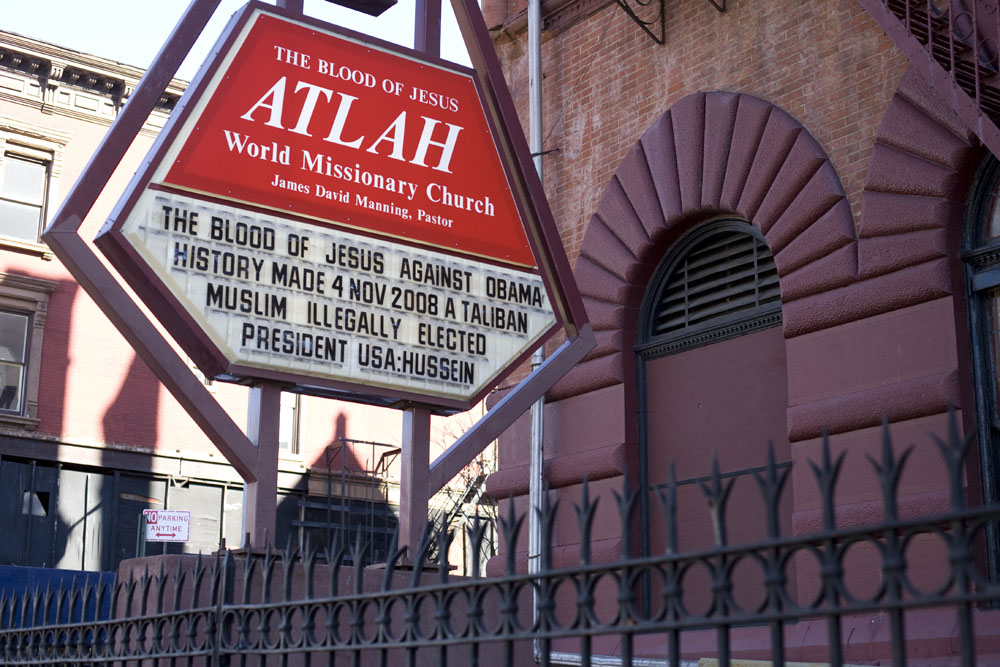
- ATLAH World Missionary Church
- Location: 38 West 123rd Street; Harlem, New York City, 10027
- Country: United States
- Denomination: Independent
- Previous denomination: Independent Baptist

History
- Former name: Bethelite Community Baptist Church
- Founded: June 10, 1957
- Founder: Millard Alexander Stanley
- Events: Mother Keturah Breakfast Program; C.I.A. Columbia Obama Sedition and Treason Trial 2010 "No Dew! No Rain!"

Architecture
- Designated: 1888-89
- Architect: Lamb & Rich
- Architectural type: Club
- Style: Queen Anne

Specifications
- Materials: red brick and terra cotta

ATLAH World Missionary Church (formerly Bethelite Missionary Baptist Church) is a Christian church and ministry located in Harlem, New York. James David Manning is the chief pastor. The church campus is the site of the unaccredited ATLAH Theological Seminary, where classes are offered on preaching and prophecy. The church also has a studio that Manning uses for his Internet radio program The Manning Report. The church's YouTube channel had over 72,000 subscribers as of March 2018 but was shut down by YouTube later that year.

== History ==
The church was founded and organized in Harlem on June 6, 1957, by the Reverend Millard Alexander Stanley as the Bethelite Community Baptist Church.

In early June, just a few days before the first worship service was held, Stanley was sitting in front of a storefront on 8th Avenue in Harlem. A local heroin addict spoke to him and said, "If y’all gonna be a church, you better 'Be-The-Lite.'" Thus, the mission was formed and named Bethelite.

In 1981, James David Manning replaced Stanley as chief pastor. Under Manning's leadership, the church name changed to ATLAH ("All The Land Anointed Holy"), and ministries were established.

Newest Ministries – The Temple Hour of Prayer May 29, 2008; and The Manning Report August 25, 2008.

- ATLAH Men's Business Association: Men's group established in 2003.
- ATLAH Superior: Started as a group of 70 women in 2003 for the establishment of a specialty food service supermarket in New York.
- ATLAH Theological Seminary: Established in 1994 as an adult-education, Bible, business, and social studies institution.
- ATLAH World Ministries: Established in 1992 as a half-hour Christian teaching radio, expanded to a weekly TV broadcast heard on several networks, and currently on YouTube and several other venues.
- Great Tomorrows Elementary/Middle School and ATLAH High School: The school was established in 1994 for the purpose of educating young people from elementary to high school focused upon a private Christian education founded on the M.A.D. Curriculum. The school is not registered and has been pending since about 2013.

This building was erected in the 1890s as the Harlem Social Club. Father Divine (c.1876–1965) and his International Peace Mission Movement were located here during the 1930s.

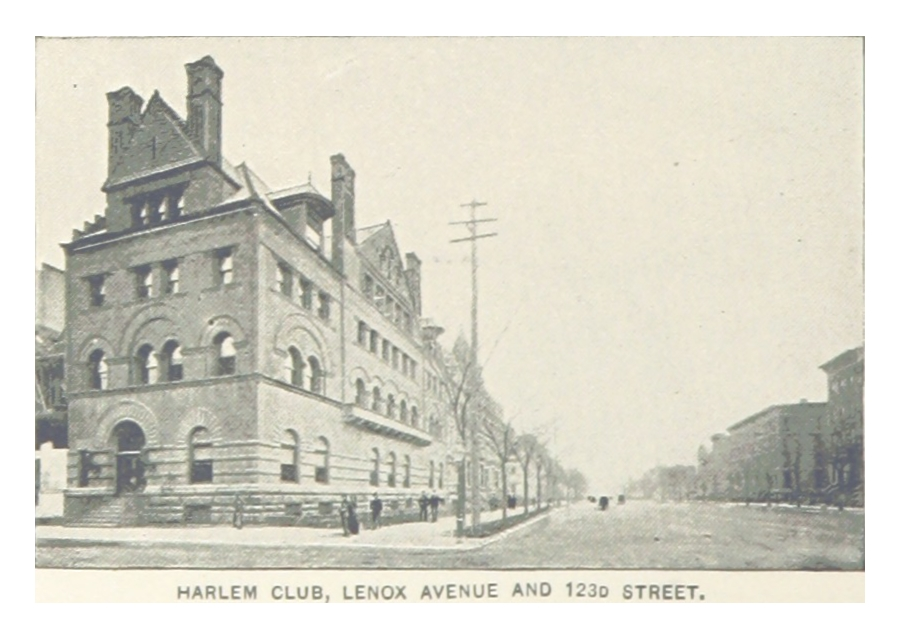
Harlem Club in the 1890s, looking south from the corner of West 124th street and Lenox Avenue, Harlem.

== Controversy and finances ==
The messages on the church letter board used anti-gay epithets and stated a Christian imperative to kill gay people by stoning. They gained notice on several websites, including some that promote gay rights and oppose hate speech.

In early 2014, the church posted a series of messages on its letter board sign that asserted that Barack Obama is a Muslim and that he is not legally president. Example messages that were documented on the websites include:

- Obama has released the homo demons on the black man. Look out black woman. A white homo may take your man.
- Many of these homos moving into Harlem looking for some black meat

In March 2014, local lesbian and transgender activist Jennifer Louise Lopez knocked on the church door to ask for her stoning.

In August 2014, Manning promised that President Vladimir Putin of Russia would release information collected by the KGB that would prove that President Obama is homosexual.

In November 2014, Manning claimed in a video presentation that Starbucks was "Ground Zero" for Ebola. He warned people to stay away from Starbucks if they did not want to get Ebola.

On November 5, Manning claimed that in "a few days' time," there would be no homosexuals in Harlem and Starbucks would close."

In January 2016, a state judge ordered ATLAH Worldwide Church to be sold at a public foreclosure auction after failing to pay creditors more than $1.02 million, court records show. The Church maintains they are afforded tax exempt status by the New York Supreme Court and are not liable for the fines citing the Court's ruling in December 2004. The Ali Forney Center announced their interest in acquiring it for the purposes of an LGBT youth homeless services center, and raised $200,000 in two weeks from a fund-raiser to achieve that goal. A temporary stay on the sale was granted pending a full hearing on April 21, 2016. Carl Siciliano of the Ali Forney Center planned to use the time to research the property. In September the judgment of foreclosure was vacated.

In 2019 the Southern Poverty Law Center added ATLAH Church to the national Hate Group List.

== Staff ==
- James David Manning, chief pastor
