= SN 1997D =

1997 supernova in the constellation Reticulum

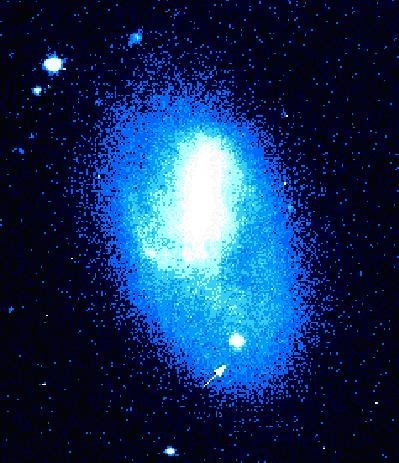
- Event type: Supernova
- Type II
- Date: 14 January 1997 by Duilia Mello
- Constellation: Reticulum
- Distance: ~43.78 million ly
- Host: NGC 1536
- Other designations: SN 1997D

SN 1997D was a supernova discovered on 14 January 1997 by Duília de Mello in NGC 1536 in the constellation Reticulum and is a first clearly identified example of atypical Type II supernova with a very low luminosity and expansion velocity.

== Progenitor ==
There are two alternatives, a high-mass 25-40 solar masses star or smaller star with mass of 8-10 solar masses. As there is no evidence that a neutron star was formed during the collapse of the star, it is likely that star was in the upper spectrum of the mass.

== Remnants ==
Observations of the light curve from SN 1997D showed no evidence of other energy sources in the expanding supernova envelope therefore it is unlikely that a neutron star was created. All the evidence leads to the creation of the stellar mass black hole of around 3 solar masses.
