= Luís Cruls =

Belgian-Brazilian astronomer (1848–1908)

Luíz Cruls
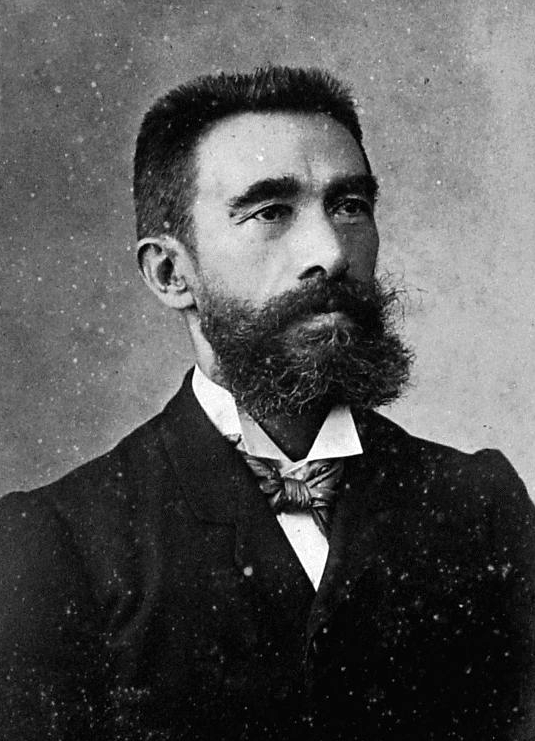
- Portrait of Luis Cruls
- Born: Louis Ferdinand Cruls; 21 January 1848; Diest, Belgium
- Died: 21 June 1908 (aged 60); Paris, France
- Education: University of Ghent
- Awards: Valz Prize (1882)
- Scientific career
- Fields: Astronomy, Geography
- Workplaces: National Observatory (Brazil)

Luíz Cruls or Luís Cruls or Louis Ferdinand Cruls (21 January 1848 – 21 June 1908) was a Belgian-Brazilian astronomer and geodesist. He was Director of the Brazilian National Observatory from 1881 to 1908, led the commission charged with the survey and selection of a future site for the capital of Brazil in the Central Plateau, and was co-discoverer of the Great Comet of 1882. Cruls was also an active proponent of efforts to accurately measure solar parallax and towards that end led a Brazilian team in their observations of 1882 Transit of Venus in Punta Arenas, Chile.

== Early life ==
Cruls was born in 1848 in Diest, Belgium, the son of Philippe Augustin Guillaume Cruls (a civil engineer) and Anne Elizabeth Jordens. From 1863 to 1868, Cruls studied civil engineering at the University of Ghent. In 1869 he undertook training as a military engineer and officer, graduating as a 2nd Lieutenant. Cruls served in the Belgian army, attaining the rank of 1st Lieutenant, until 1873 or 1874 (sources disagree).

Likely inspired by Brazilian friends at University (including Caetano de Almeida Furquim, a fellow engineer), Cruls resigned his commission and set out for Brazil on 5 September 1874. During the trans-Atlantic crossing on the steamer Orénoque, Cruls met and became friends with Joaquim Nabuco, a journalist and abolitionist, and also the son of Jose Thomas Nabuco, an influential Brazilian politician. Nabuco's connections were to provide Cruls with access to the highest levels of Brazilian society.

== Brazil, Belgium, and back again ==
Within weeks after Cruls's arrival in Brazil, Joaquim Nabuco and his father arranged for him to be presented to Dom Pedro II, Emperor of Brazil, and more importantly, to meet Buarque de Macedo, the Director General of the Ministry of Public Works. This latter meeting led to Cruls being hired as an engineer by the Commission of the Empire General Charter (Comissão da Carta Geral do Império) in the Geodesy section.

In January 1875 Cruls was forced to return to Belgium for family reasons. The Commission took Cruls's unexpected return as an opportunity, and assigned him the duty of assisting the Brazilian ambassador in coordinating the receipt and transportation of geodesic instruments that the Commission had previously purchased. While in Europe, published his first major paper, Discussion of the Methods of Repetition and Reiteration Employed in Geodesy for the Angles. Crul's monograph analyzed the various methods then used to fix geographic points via triangulation. This work won Cruls the respect of Emmanuel Liais, director of the Imperial Observatory in Rio de Janeiro, who would later hire him in 1877. Cruls returned to Brazil in June 1875 and continued his work with the Commission until its dissolution.

Cruls married Maria Margarida de Oliveira on 26 May 1877. Luiz and Maria would remain married until his death. The Cruls made their home in the Rio neighborhood of Laranjeiras and had six children: Edmée, Stella, Sylvie, Maria Luísa, Henri (who died as a child), and Gastão. Gastão Cruls would not only grow up to follow in his father's footsteps and an astronomer and geographer, but also would go on to have a successful career as writer, publishing both novels and non-fiction.

== Imperial Observatory ==
In December 1877, Emmanuel Liais appointed Cruls to the Commission on Longitude, a position at the Imperial Observatory. (After Brazil became a republic in 1889, the Observatory's name was changed to Observatory of Rio de Janeiro, and in 1909, to the National Observatory of Brazil, the name by which it is known today.) Over the next two years, under the tutelage of Liais, Cruls produced several works that helped to build his international reputation as an astronomer:

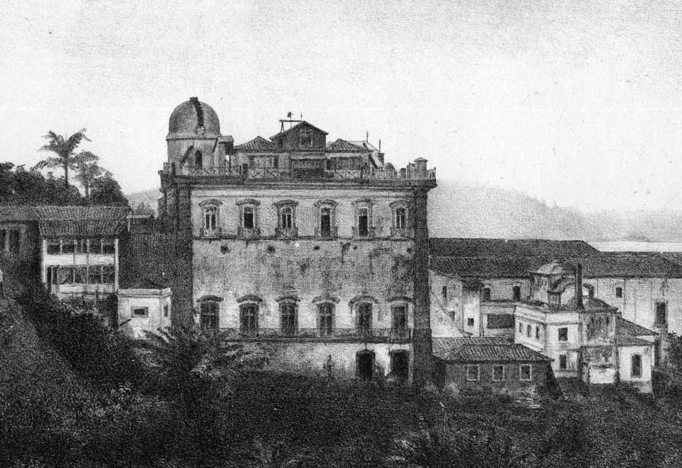
Imperial Observatory of Brazil

- Note on Mars a monograph on his observations of the surface features and rotation of Mars during its 1877 opposition.
- On Observations on the Transit of Mercury of May 6, 1878 was Cruls's first scientific paper to be published in the Comptes Rendus of the French Academy of Sciences, and provided estimates the diameters of the Sun and Mercury.
- Note on the Star System 40 Eridani B, in which Cruls used two sets of observations (taken at six-month intervals) to determine that 40 Eridani B's parallax.
- Probable Orbital Movements of Some Binary Systems of the Southern Heavens and Spectroscopic Research on Some Unstudied Stars, both articles appearing in the same issue of Comptes Rendus.

Cruls would go on to publish a total thirty-five papers, monographs, and books on astronomy in his lifetime; the majority would be published in Comptes Rendus In 1879, Cruls was promoted to Assistant Astronomer, based both on his work at the Observatory and the high regard Liais had for Cruls's scientific capabilities.

On 12 February 1881, Cruls was naturalized as a Brazilian citizen by Emperor Dom Pedro II. Cruls took this opportunity to formally change his first name to "Luíz", the Brazilian form of "Louis" or "Luís". A few months later, Cruls's mentor Emmanuel Liais resigned, and Cruls was appointed as interim director of the Imperial Observatory. Liais had become worn down by public accusations of scientific incompetence and dishonesty from Manuel Pereira Reis (an astronomer he had dismissed as head of the Commission of the Empire General Charter in 1878) and returned to Cherbourg, France. However, Pereira Reis was to transfer his animosity to Cruls, and would remain a persistent critic of Cruls and the Observatory for the rest of his life.

== 1882: Cruls's annus mirabilis ==
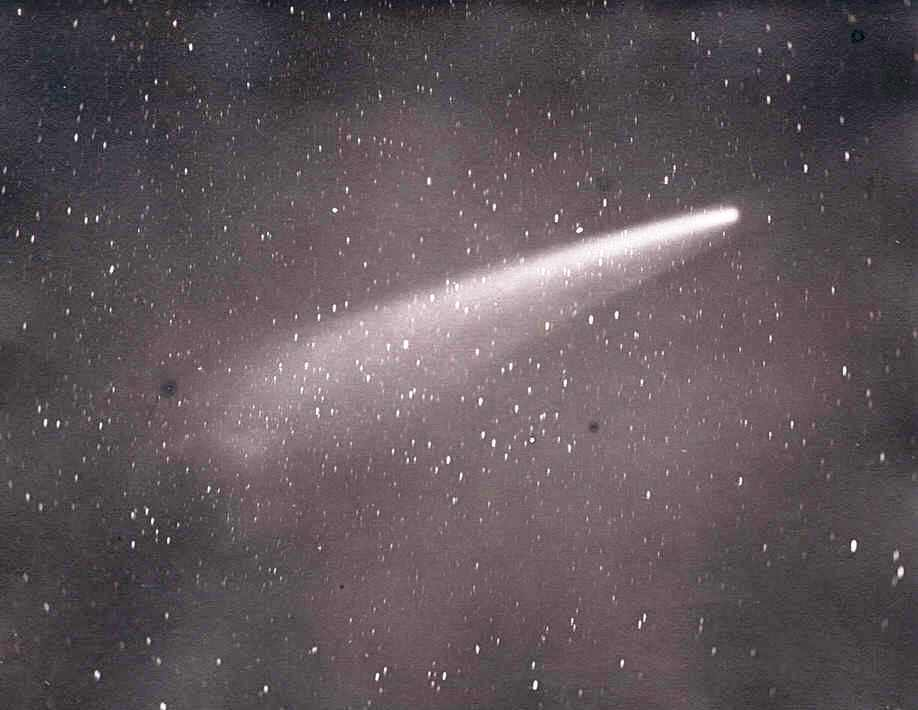
The Great Comet of 1882

In his Biographical Encyclopedia of Astronomers, Thomas Hockey cites 1882 as Cruls's annus mirabilis. In that single year, Cruls co-discovered the Great Comet of 1882, led a Brazilian expedition in observations of the 1882 Transit of Venus, and received the Valz Prize from the French Academy of Sciences.

== Legacy ==
In its obituary for Cruls, Nature cited Cruls's observations of the 1882 Transit of Venus at Punta Arenas as one of his most important achievements in astronomy. In 1883, Cruls shared the Valz prize with English astronomer William Huggins for his work on spectral analysis of the Great Comet of 1882.

Cruls Crater on Mars is named in his honor. The Cruls Islands in the southern Wilhelm Archipelago off the coast of the Antarctic Peninsula are also named for him, as is Refuge Astronomer Cruls, a Brazilian Antarctic summer base. Cruls was also honored on a Brazilian postage stamp in 1992 celebrating the centennial of the Cruls Commission.

Asteroid 29298 Cruls is named after him.

== See also ==
- List of astronomers § L. Cruls
