= Duília de Mello =

Brazilian astronomer

Duília Fernandes de Mello
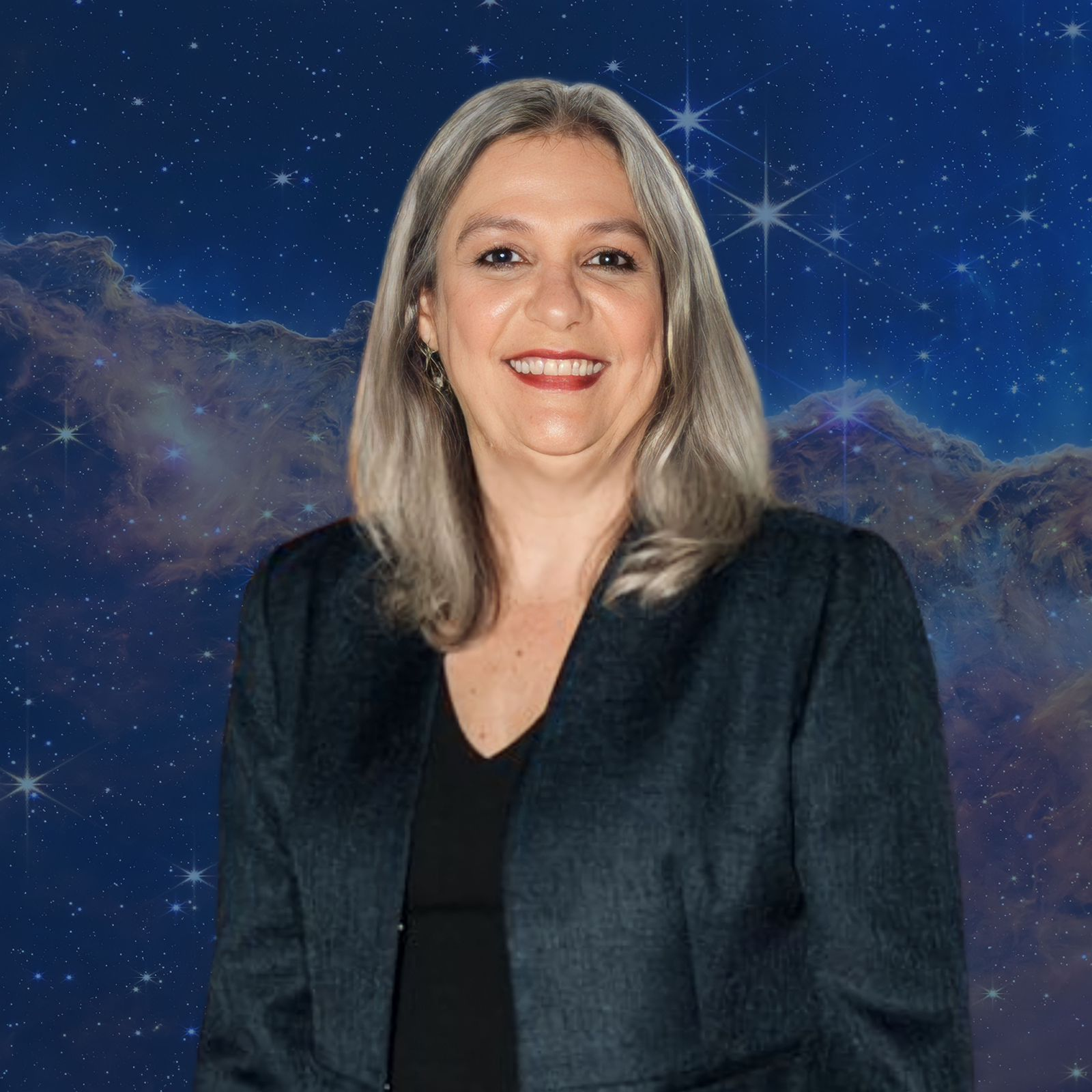
- Born: 27 November 1963 (age 62); Jundiaí, São Paulo, Brazil
- Citizenship: Brazilian, American
- Education: Federal University of Rio de Janeiro; National Institute for Space Research; University of São Paulo
- Scientific career
- Fields: Astronomy
- Workplaces: The Catholic University of America; Goddard Space Flight Center

Duília de Mello (born 27 November 1963) is a Brazilian astronomer. She is currently full professor in physics at the Catholic University of America and collaborates with NASA Goddard Space Flight Center.

She has been serving as Vice Provost for Global Strategies of the Catholic University of America since September 2019. De Mello previously served as Vice Provost and Dean of Assessment and Vice Provost for Research Support of the Catholic University of America from 2016 to 2018 and 2018–2019.

Prior to this, she was the Program Coordinator of the Science Without Borders from 2012 to 2016 in the Physics Department. She is the first woman to become a full professor in physics at Catholic University.

== Early life and education ==
Born in Jundiaí, São Paulo and growing up in Rio de Janeiro, she became inspired by the moon despite not having a telescope as a child. In the 1970s she was fascinated with Star Trek and Lost in Space, and in her teenage years she was following the discoveries by the NASA probes traveling through the solar system such as Pioneer 10, Pioneer 11 and Voyager 2.

As a child, she went to public and catholic schools. The family moved from São Paulo to Belo Horizonte and settled in Rio de Janeiro. She is the youngest of four children and they are first-generation college students.

Her undergraduate degree is from Federal University of Rio de Janeiro (Portuguese: Universidade Federal do Rio de Janeiro) as a Bachelor of Science in astronomy, achieved in 1986. She went on to earn two masters: MS in Radio Astronomy from National Institute for Space Research (Portuquese: Instituto Nacional de Pesquisas Espaciais) in 1988; MS in Physics and Astronomy from the University of Alabama in 1993. She went on to earn her Ph.D. in astronomy from the University of São Paulo in 1995.

== Academic career and research ==
After receiving her doctorate, she became a postdoctoral fellow at Cerro Tololo Interamerican Observatory in Chile and National Observatory in Rio de Janeiro from 1995 to 1997.

De Mello joined the Space Telescope Science Institute (STScI) as a postdoctoral fellow from 1997 to 1999. After, she went to Gothenburg, Sweden, to work as an assistant professor at Chalmers University of Technology. She is also a Swedish citizen.

Her area of research is extragalactic astrophysics and her major instrument of work is the Hubble Space Telescope. She is a member of the teams taking the deepest images of the Universe with Hubble HDF-S, GOODS, CANDELS e UVUDF. Among her major accomplishments are the discovery of the supernova 1997D, the largest spiral galaxy in the universe NGC 6872, and stellar nurseries born outside colliding galaxies, known as "blue blobs". These "blue blobs" had never been discovered in such a sparse location before de Mello's discovery.

She has written over 100 articles for a number of publications, including refereed journals, magazines, and Newspapers. She is among the most cited scholars of Catholic University of America reaching over 16,000 citations.

== Contribution to the Humanities ==
As Vice Provost, de Mello oversees the Libraries of the Catholic University of America and advocates for the humanities. She is known as the guardian of the Oliveira Lima Library, the largest Brasiliana collection outside Brazil. As such, she has hosted dozens of dignitaries including ministers, ambassadors, provosts, directors, businesses people, artists and philanthropists. In 2018 the Oliveira Lima Library received the Order of the Cultural Merit by the President of Brazil and in 2020 the library also received the Order of Rio Branco.

== Advocacy ==
Beyond her research career, she is the founder of the project Mulher das Estrelas that popularizes science and encourages female students to follow careers in STEM. She has also written two motivational book for students to study science, Living with the Stars and The Adventures of Pedro, A Space Rock. More recently she started a project called CArte that brings science together with art to the public.

== Other activities ==
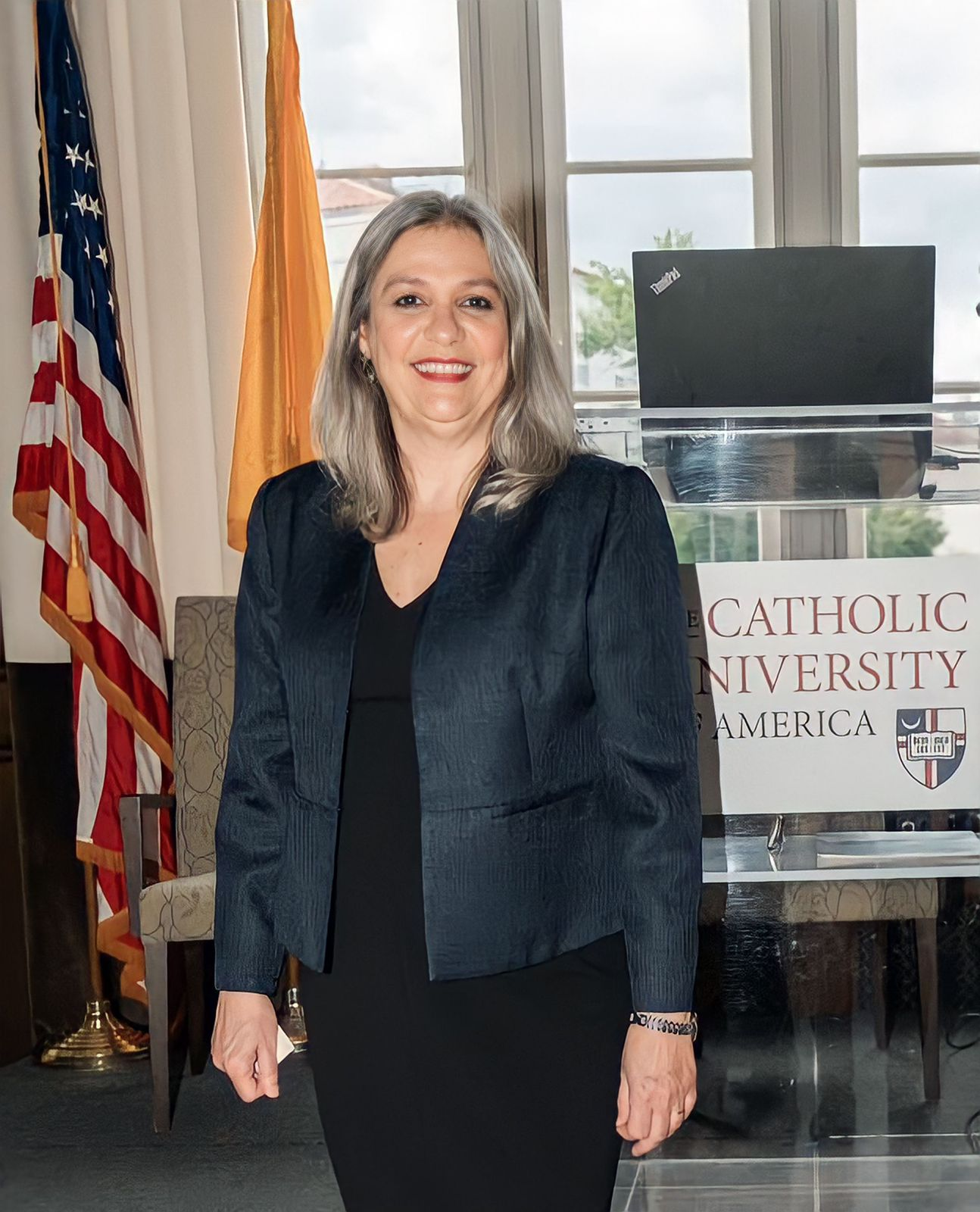

Columnist of the Galileu magazine since 10/2018.

Keynote speaker in several events including two TEDx. Spoke to 6,000 high school students in the Ibirapuera Arena in 2018 and 2019.

Elected US national representative of the American Astronomical Society in the International Astronomical Union.

== Recognition ==
In 2013, Barnard College recognized de Mello as one of their "Women Changing Brazil".

In 2014, she won the Diaspora Brazil Award in the Professional of the Year 2013 category in Technology, Information and Communication, granted by the Ministry of Foreign Affairs and the Ministry of Industry and Commerce. In the same year, she was selected by Época magazine as one of the 100 most influential people in Brazil.

In 2017, she was considered one of the 17 women who made a difference by UOL.

In 2020, she received the Order of Rio Branco in the rank of Officer. The Order is an honor bestowed to individuals due to exceptional services or merits by the nation of Brazil.

In 2022, she joined the list of 50 names over 50 by Brazil Forbes magazine. In the same year, her story was featured in the "Fantastic Women" in the TV program Fantástico.

In 2024, she was awarded the Santos-Dumont Merit Medal by the Brazilian Air Force in recognition of her services to the institution. The award ceremony took place at the Catholic University of America in Washington, D.C.
