= Cruls Islands =

Island group in Wilhelm Archipelago, Antarctica

- Location within Antarctica

Geography
- Location: Antarctica
- Coordinates: 65°11′S 64°32′W
- Archipelago: Wilhelm Archipelago

Administration
- Administered under the Antarctic Treaty System

Demographics
- Population: Uninhabited

The Cruls Islands or Crulls Islands are a group of small islands lying 2 km (1 nmi) west of the Roca Islands in the southern part of the Wilhelm Archipelago. They were discovered by the Belgian Antarctic Expedition, 1897–99, and named by Gerlache for Luís Cruls (also known as Louis Crulls), a Belgian astronomer and later Director of the Observatory at Rio de Janeiro.

== See also ==
- List of Antarctic and sub-Antarctic islands
- Luis Cruls
