= Drum Rock =

Drum Rock (65°14′S 64°16′W) is an insular rock in the Argentine Islands, Graham Coast, rising 6 metres (20 ft) above sea level on the eastern edge of the Forge Islands, between Smooth Island and Grotto Island. The name is descriptive of the shape of the rock and became established through local usage at the British Antarctic Survey Faraday Station during the 1980s. It is one of many named rock formations of Graham Land.
