= Smooth Island (Antarctica) =

Island in Wilhelm Archipelago, Antarctica

- Location within Antarctica

Geography
- Location: Antarctica
- Coordinates: 65°13′S 64°16′W
- Archipelago: Wilhelm Archipelago

Administration
- Administered under the Antarctic Treaty System

Demographics
- Population: Uninhabited

Smooth Island is the northeasternmost of the Forge Islands, Argentine Islands, in the Wilhelm Archipelago. The name, given by the United Kingdom Antarctic Place-Names Committee (UK-APC) in 1961, is descriptive of the smooth, ice-free surface of this island, which is a useful navigational mark for vessels approaching Bloor Passage from the north.

== See also ==
- List of Antarctic and sub-Antarctic islands
- Drum Rock
