= Irizar (surname) =

Irizar or Irízar is a surname of Basque origin, which in Basque means "old town".

- Aarón Irízar López (born 1950), Mexican politician
- Alberto Irízar, Argentine actor and comedian
- José Irízar (1882–1935), Spanish footballer
- José Luis Irizar Artiach, Basque priest, canon, and director of missions
- Julen Irizar (born 1995), Spanish cyclist
- Julián Irizar (1869–1935), Argentine admiral of the Argentine Navy
- Luis Irizar (1930–2021), Basque chef
- Markel Irizar (born 1980), Basque professional cyclist
- Miguel Irízar Campos (1934–2018), Spanish-born Peruvian Roman Catholic bishop
- Miguel de Irízar (1635–1684), Spanish Baroque composer
- Maritxu Sangroniz Irizar, Chilean journalist and television presenter
- Paolo Yrízar, Mexican football player

== See also ==
- Irizar, a Spanish-based manufacturer of luxury buses and coaches
- Irizar Island, an island near the northeast of Uruguay Island
