= Fanfare Island =

Island in Wilhelm Archipelago, Antarctica

Fanfare Island (65°13′S 64°11′W) is the northernmost of the Argentine Islands, lying 1.5 nautical miles (3 km) south of Herald Reef in the Wilhelm Archipelago. It was named by the UK Antarctic Place-Names Committee in 1961 from association with Herald Reef.

== See also ==
- List of Antarctic and sub-Antarctic islands
