= Chaigneau =

Chaigneau may refer to:

== People ==
- Florent Chaigneau (born 1984), French professional footballer
- Jean-Baptiste Chaigneau (1769–1832), French soldier and adventurer
- Suzanne Chaigneau (1875–1946), French musician

== Other ==
- Chaigneau (grape), French wine grape that is also known as Enfariné noir
- Chaigneau-Brasier, French car manufacturer
- Chaigneau Peak, Antarctic mountain
