= Richard Frost (disambiguation) =

Richard Frost was a U.S. representative from Missouri.

Richard Frost may also refer to:

- Richard Frost (poet) in The Best American Poetry 1995
- Richard Frost (horse racing) in 1990 Cheltenham Gold Cup
- Richard Frost (oceanographer), namesake of Frost Rocks
