= Anvil Rock =

Island in the Bellingshausen Sea

Coordinates: 65°14′S 64°16′W

Anvil Rock is a rock between Grotto Island and the southeast end of the Forge Islands in the Argentine Islands, Wilhelm Archipelago. It was charted and named in 1935 by the British Graham Land Expedition under John Riddoch Rymill. The name is descriptive.
