= Navy Point =

Navy Point (64°30′S 62°28′W) is the northeast entrance point to Chiriguano Bay in southeast Brabant Island, Palmer Archipelago. The feature was charted in 1954 by the Argentine Antarctic Expedition and named "Punta Marina" (Navy Point) in 1978 in honor of the Argentine Navy. A complete translation of the name has been approved to avoid a duplication of Marina Point in the Argentine Islands.
