= Winter Island (Antarctica) =

Island in Wilhelm Archipelago, Antarctica

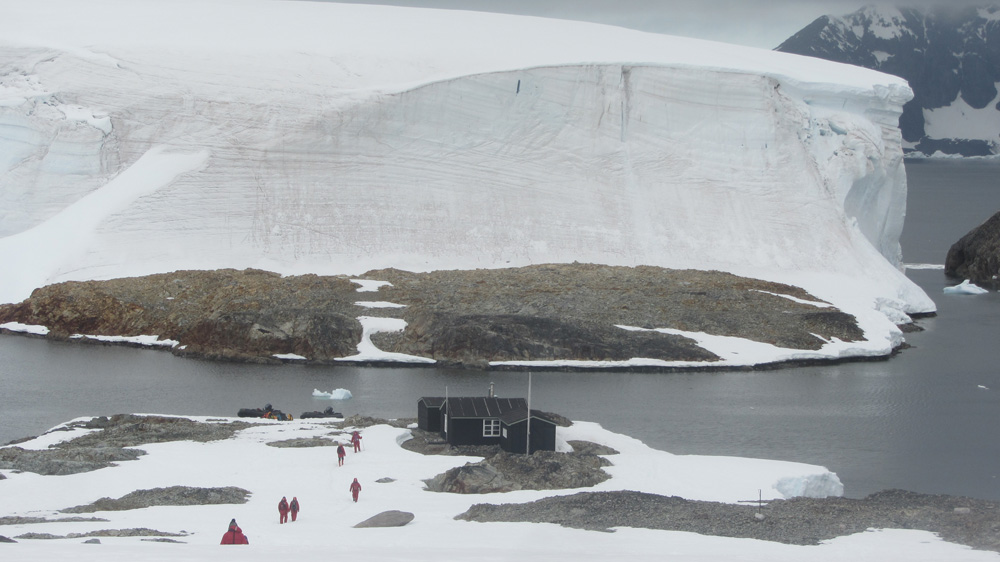
- Wordie House on Winter Island

- Location within Antarctica

Geography
- Location: Antarctica
- Coordinates: 65°14′58″S 64°15′35″W
- Archipelago: Argentine Islands, Wilhelm Archipelago
- Length: 900 m (3000 ft)

Administration
- Administered under the Antarctic Treaty System

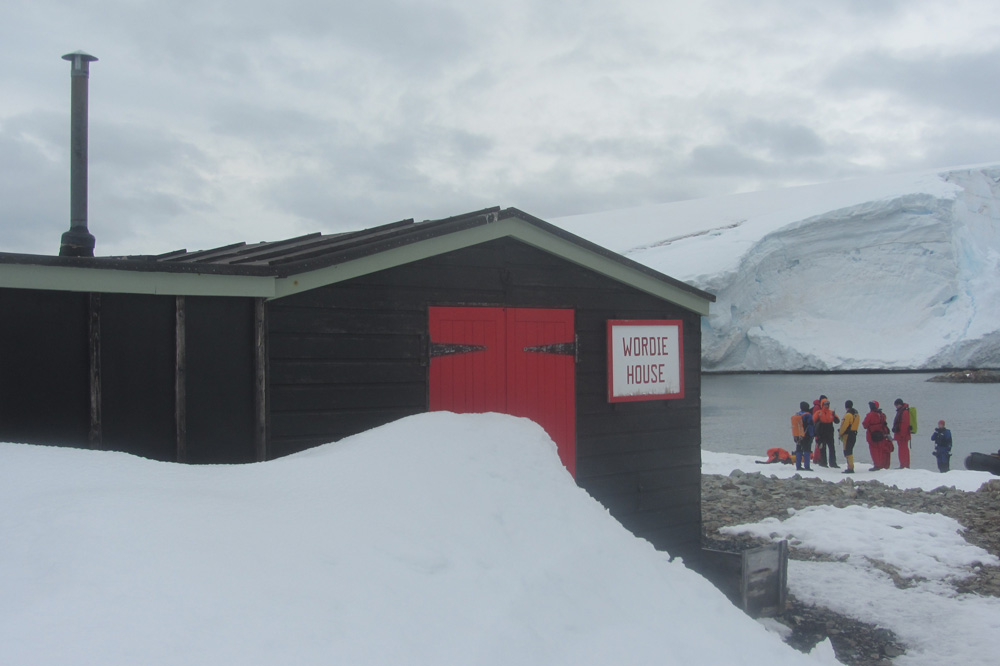
Wordie House on Winter Island

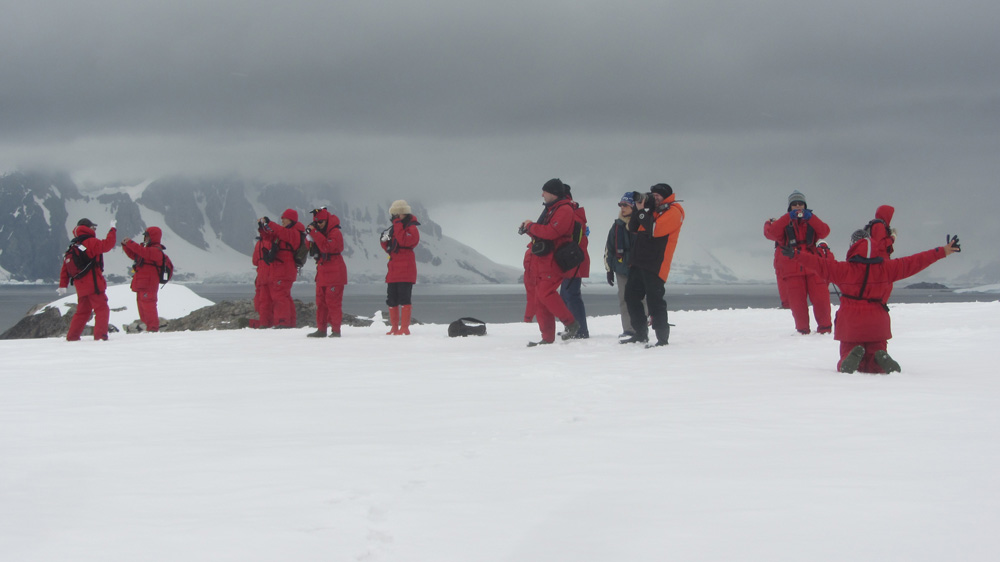
Tourists on Winter Island, Antarctica

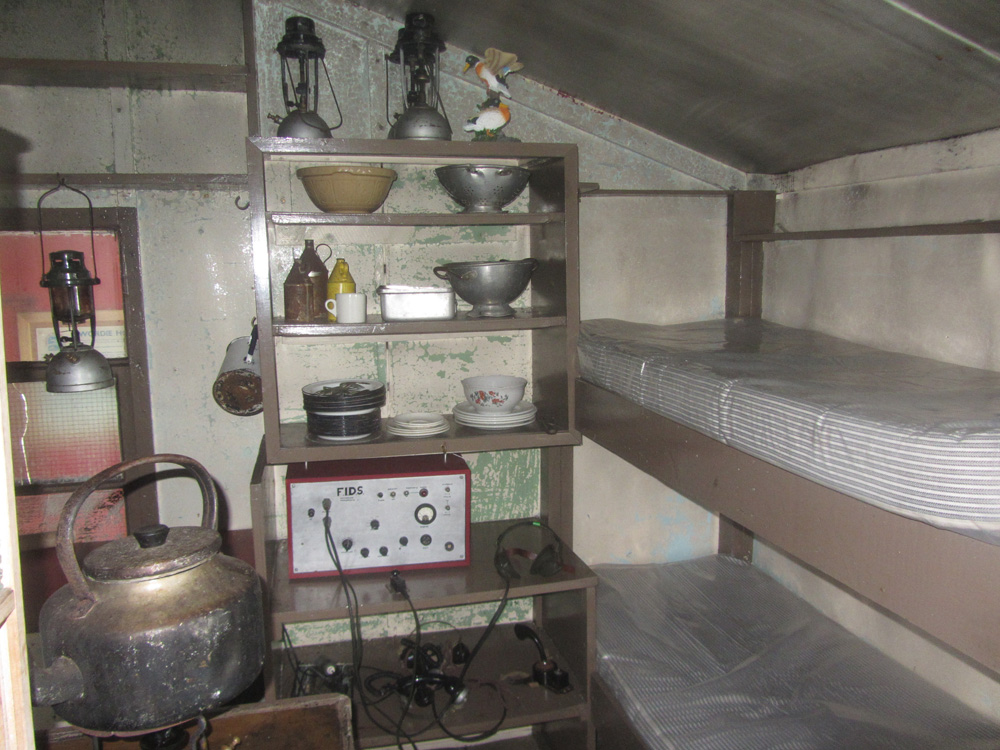
Interior of Wordie House on Winter Island

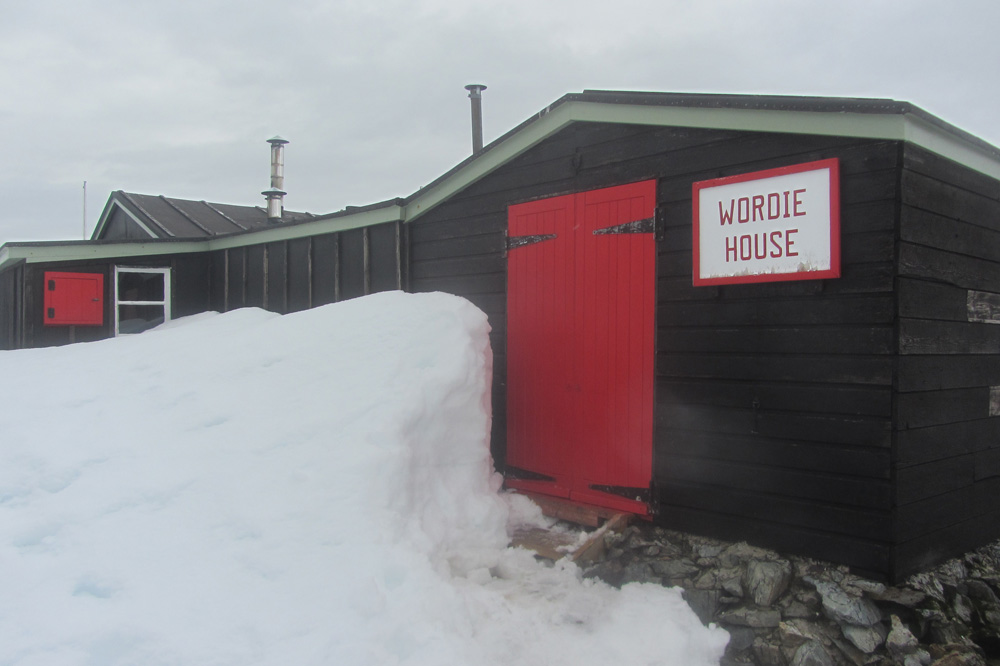
Wordie House on Winter Island

Winter Island is an island 900 m (980 yd) long, lying 200 m (220 yd) north of Skua Island in the Argentine Islands, Wilhelm Archipelago, off the west coast of Graham Land, Antarctica.

== History ==
Winter Island was named by the British Graham Land Expedition (BGLE), 1934–37, which made this island the site of its winter base during 1935.

The Falkland Islands Dependencies Survey established a base on Winter Island in 1947, Base F (Argentine Islands). The main hut, built on the site of the old BGLE hut, was named "Wordie House" after Sir James Wordie, a member of Shackleton's Imperial Trans-Antarctic Expedition who visited during its construction.

Wordie House "was constructed using building materials from the hut at Port Lockroy and material salvaged from the whaling station at Deception Island,” according to the United Kingdom Antarctic Heritage Trust. In May 1954, “the operation of the station and science program moved to a new building on the neighboring Galindez Island. The station was renamed Faraday and it continued the longstanding meteorological program that began at Wordie House. Faraday was renamed Vernadsky in 1996 when the UK transferred it to Ukraine.”

In 1960, Wordie House was briefly reoccupied when a party failed to reach Base T at Adelaide Island and were forced to overwinter in the hut.

“The hut consists of the kitchen and living room, generator shed, office, dog room, and toilet,” according to the trust. “A number of original artefacts are still found on site. … A timber flagpole and a rare timber British Crown Land sign are also found outside.”

Normal occupancy of Wordie House in its early years was four to five people. Cans of coffee and other goods, records, tools, paint cans, plates, pots, pans, books, typewriters, radio equipment, and other items still remain in the hut, making it a fascinating time capsule of life in one of the first scientific stations established in Antarctica.

=== Historic site ===
Wordie House is of historic importance as an example of an early British scientific base. It has been restored and designated a Historic Site or Monument (HSM 62), following a proposal by the United Kingdom to the Antarctic Treaty Consultative Meeting.

An Antarctic Treaty Visitor Site Guide for Wordie House is available from the United Kingdom Antarctic Heritage Trust.

== See also ==
- List of Antarctic and sub-Antarctic islands
- Stella Creek
