= Channel Rock (Argentine Islands) =

Rock in the Wilhelm Archipelago of Antarctica

Channel Rock (65°14′S 64°16′W) is a rock which lies in the northwest entrance to Meek Channel in the Argentine Islands, Wilhelm Archipelago. Charted and named in 1935 by the British Graham Land Expedition (BGLE) under Rymill.

== Sources ==
- Alberts, Fred G., ed. (1995), Geographic Names of the Antarctic (PDF) (2 ed.), United States Board on Geographic Names This article incorporates public domain material from websites or documents of the United States Board on Geographic Names.
