= Skua Island (Antarctica) =

Island in Wilhelm Archipelago, Antarctica

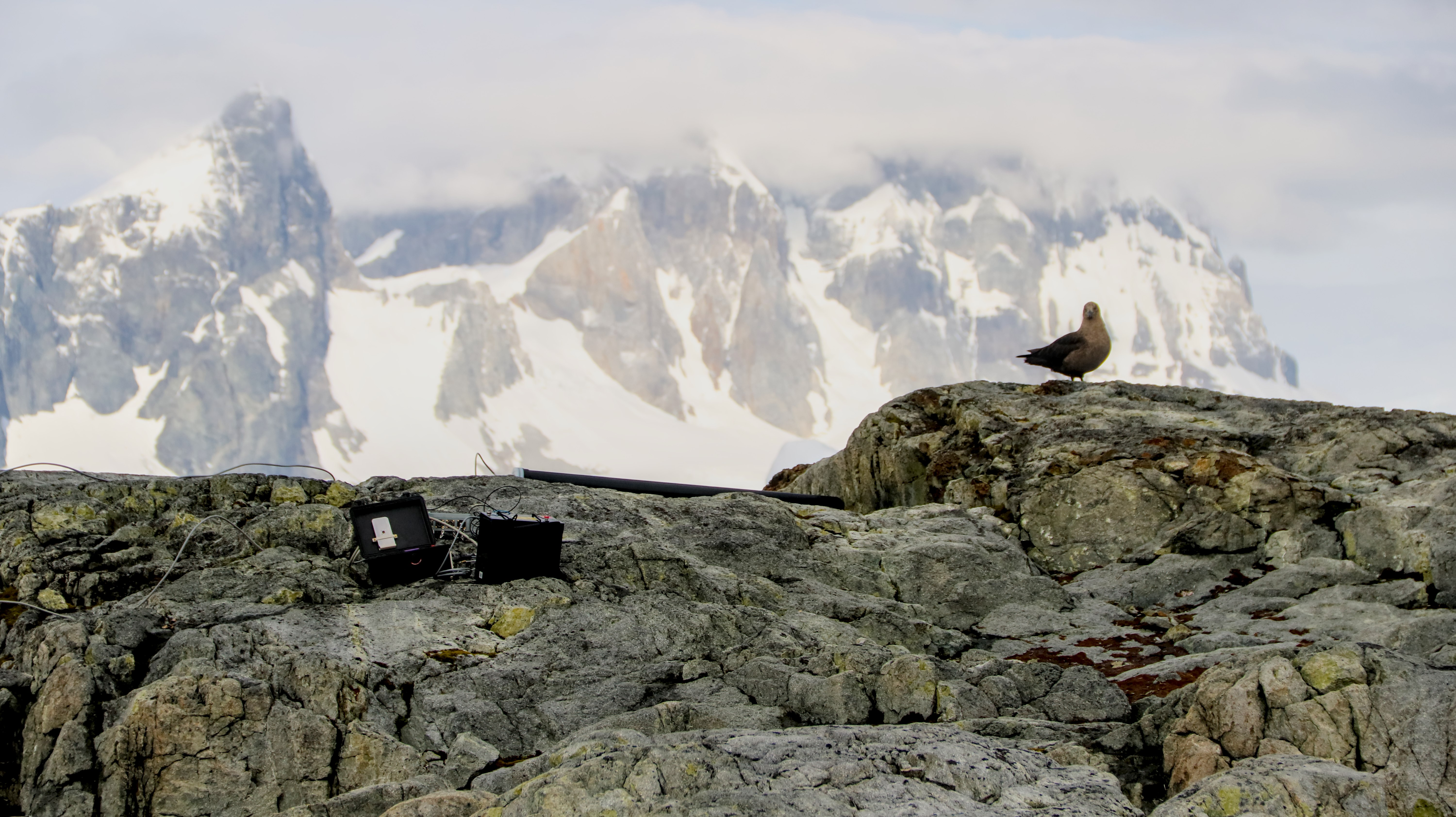
- Field VLF Measurements on Skua Island

- Location within Antarctica

Geography
- Location: Antarctica
- Coordinates: 65°15′S 64°16′W
- Archipelago: Argentine Islands, Wilhelm Archipelago

Administration
- Administered under the Antarctic Treaty System

Demographics
- Population: Uninhabited

Skua Island (65°15′S 64°16′W) is a roughly triangular island 0.7 nautical miles (1.3 km; 0.81 mi) long, lying between Black Island to the southwest and Winter Island and Galindez Island to the north and northeast, in the Argentine Islands, Wilhelm Archipelago.

== Location ==
Graham Coast, Antarctic Peninsula. Argentine Islands near the east end

The Argentine Islands are off the Graham Coast of the Antarctic Peninsula. They are south of the French Passage, west of Mount Shackleton on the mainland, north of the Berthelot Islands and Grandidier Channel and east of the Betbeder Islands.

== Sailing directions ==
The US Defense Mapping Agency's Sailing Directions for Antarctica (1976) describes Skua Island and its surroundings as follows:

Cornice Channel, which separates Galindez Island and Skua Island, is narrow and shallow at its northern entrance; it has a depth of 4 feet in it. The channel between Galindez Island and Skua Island, which is known as Skua Creek (Skua Inlet), has depths that decrease from 11 fathoms at the northwestern entrance to 8 feet at the south-eastern extremity. The southeastern end of the channel is obstructed by foul ground. The northwestern entrance to the channel is narrowed by a bank, which extends from its northeastern side, and on which there is a rock with a depth of 6 feet over it. In 1947, the M.V. Trepassey entered this channel from northwestward and anchored otf the southeastern oorner of winter Island, close to the meteorological station. The fast Ice. In Skua Creek, does not always break ont each summer.

A number of islets and above-water rocks lie within 200 yards of the western aide of Skua Island and shoals have been observed from the air, to extend about 400 yards southward from the southern side of the same island. The northwestern part of the Argentine Islands contain three groups of islands. The northern group is named Horseshoe Islands [Forge Islands], the central, Three Little Pigs, and the southern, Shelter Islands...

The southwesternmost group of the Argentine Islands consists of two principal islands, of which the southeastern is named Black Island and the northwestern is named Leopard Island, and a number of islets and above-water and sunken rocks. Black Island Channel, which passes between Skua Island and Black Island, is about 200 yards wide, deep and dear of dangers in the fairway, but Runciman Rock, is marked by breakers, lies in the middle of the southern apprnech to the channel, about 200 yards eastward of Black Island, and shoals extend southward from Skua Island and about 200 yards southeastward from Finger Point, its southwestern extremity. A 7-foot depth Use about 600 yards eastward of Runciman Rock. The John Biscoe reported, in June 1950, that Meek Channel, as an anchorage and refuge, is preferable to Black Island Channel; and that throughout the two previous seasons Black Island Channel had been blocked by icebergs. Meek Channel Is also blocked at times by icebergs.

Between Winter Island and Skua Island, on the southeast, and Three Little Pigs and Shelter Islands, on the northwest, is an area about half a mile long from east to west and about 400 yards wide, with depths of 8 to 19 fathoms. The channel leading to this area from Black Island Channel and peening between Skua Island and Shelter Island is deep and clear of dangers in the fairway.

== Exploration and name ==
Skua Island was charted and named in 1935 by the British Graham Land Expedition (BGLE) under John Rymill.

== Features ==
Features and nearby features include:

=== Finger Point ===
65°15′S 64°17′W. Point which forms the southwest end of Skua Island. Charted and named by the BGLE, 1934-37, under Rymill.

=== Shelter Islands ===
65°15′S 64°17′W. Group of small islands lying 0.3 nautical miles (0.56 km; 0.35 mi) west of Winter Island. Charted and named by the BGLE, 1934-37, under Rymill.

=== Winter Island ===
65°15′S 64°16′W. Island 0.5 nautical miles (0.93 km; 0.58 mi) long, lying 0.1 nautical miles (0.19 km; 0.12 mi) north of Skua Island in the Argentine Islands, Wilhelm Archipelago. Winter Island was named by the BGLE, 1934-37, which made this island the site of its winter base during 1935.

=== Skua Creek ===
65°15′S 64°16′W. Narrow channel between Skua Island and Winter Island. Charted and named Skua Inlet in 1935 by the BGLE under Rymill, but in recent years the name Skua Creek has overtaken the earlier name in usage.

=== Black Island Channel ===
65°15′S 64°17′W. Channel 0.1 nautical miles (0.19 km; 0.12 mi) wide between Black Island and Skua Island. Charted and named in 1935 by the BGLE under Rymill.

=== Runciman Rock ===
65°15′S 64°17′W. Rock marked by breakers, lying 0.1 nautical miles (0.19 km; 0.12 mi) east of Black Island at the southeast approach to Black Island Channel. Charted in 1935 by the BGLE under Rymill, who named it for Philip Runciman, Chairman of the Board of Directors of Whites Southampton Yachtbuilding and Engineering Company Limited, where the ship Penola was refitted before sailing south in 1934.

=== Leopard Island ===
65°15′S 64°18′W. Island 0.2 nautical miles (0.37 km; 0.23 mi) long, lying 0.2 nautical miles (0.37 km; 0.23 mi) west of the southwest end of Skua Island. Charted and named in 1935 by the BGLE under Rymill.

=== Black Island ===
65°15′S 64°17′W. Island 0.2 nautical miles (0.37 km; 0.23 mi) long, lying close southwest of Skua Island. Charted and named descriptively in 1935 by the BGLE under Rymill.

== Sources ==
- Alberts, Fred G., ed. (1995), Geographic Names of the Antarctic (PDF) (2 ed.), United States Board on Geographic Names This article incorporates public domain material from websites or documents of the United States Board on Geographic Names.
- Graham Land and South Shetland Islands, BAS: British Antarctic Survey, 2005
- Sailing Directions for Antarctica: Includes Islands South of Latitude 60.̊, United States. Defense Mapping Agency. Hydrographic Center, 1976 This article incorporates public domain material from websites or documents of the National Geospatial-Intelligence Agency.
