= Argentine Islands =

Group of islands in Wilhelm Archipelago

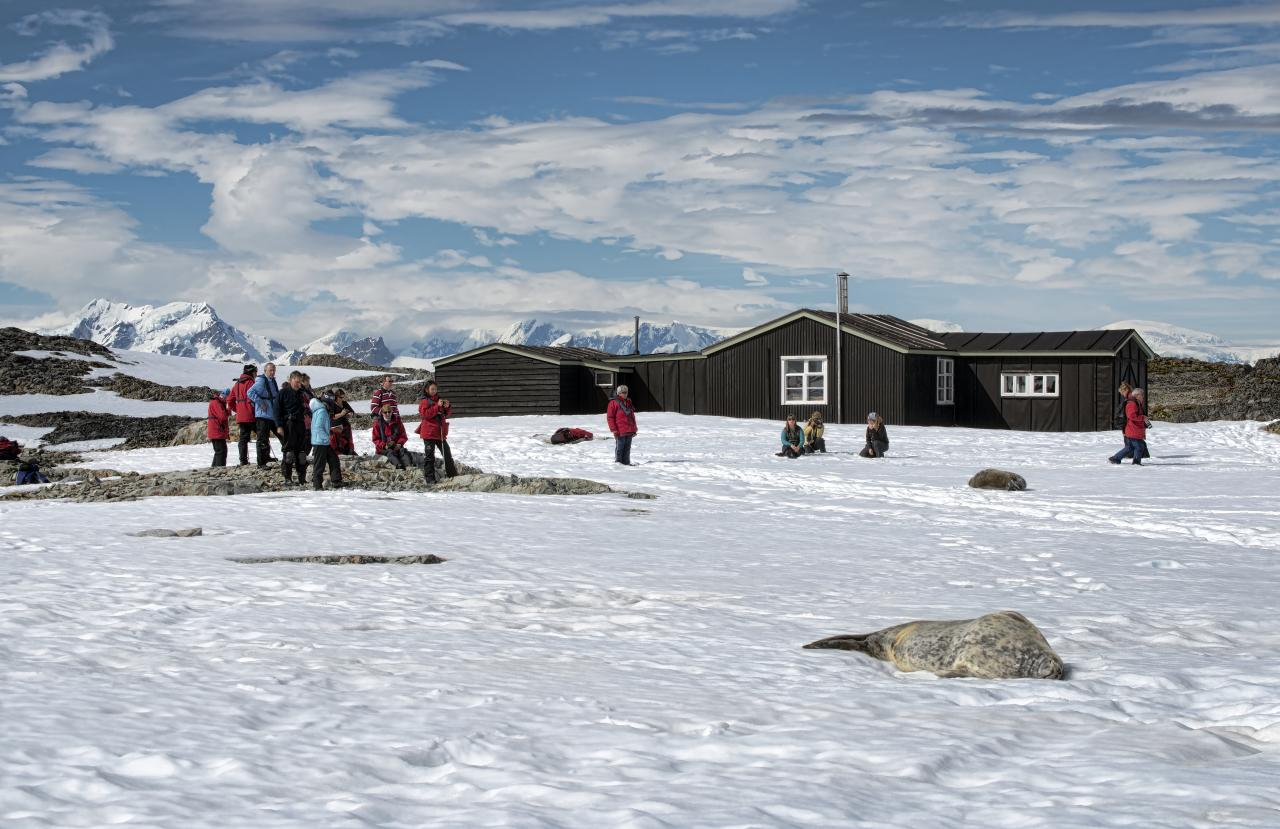
- Wordie House, photographed in 2013

- Location within Antarctica

Geography
- Location: Antarctica
- Coordinates: 65°15′S 64°16′W

Administration
- Administered under the Antarctic Treaty System

The Argentine Islands are a group of islands in the Wilhelm Archipelago of Antarctica, situated 9 km (5 nmi) southwest of Petermann Island, and 7 km (4 nmi) northwest of Cape Tuxen on Kyiv Peninsula in Graham Land. They were discovered by the French Antarctic Expedition, 1903–05, under Jean-Baptiste Charcot, and named by him for the Argentine Republic, in appreciation of that government's support of his expedition.

== History ==
The British Graham Land Expedition under John Riddoch Rymill was based in the Argentine Islands in 1935 and conducted a thorough survey of them. The expedition built a hut on Winter Island, which was used as their northern base; it was left in place at the end of the expedition, but destroyed circa 1946. The following year, the British Falkland Islands Dependencies Survey established a permanent base on the same site, as "Base F" (or "Argentine Islands"); the main building from this base, Wordie House, is now a protected historic site (HSM-62). The base was moved to Galindez Island in 1954, renamed "Faraday" in 1977, and transferred to the Ukrainian Antarctic program in 1996, who continue to operate it as Vernadsky Research Base.

== Climate ==
The Argentine Islands have a polar climate that lies in the transition zone between an ice cap climate and a tundra climate, displaying an unusually continental version of that climate for being on the ocean.

Climate data for Argentine Islands
| Month | Jan | Feb | Mar | Apr | May | Jun | Jul | Aug | Sep | Oct | Nov | Dec | Year |
|---|---|---|---|---|---|---|---|---|---|---|---|---|---|
| Record high °C (°F) | 7.8 (46.0) | 8.3 (46.9) | 7.8 (46.0) | 7.2 (45.0) | 6.1 (43.0) | 4.4 (39.9) | 3.9 (39.0) | 7.2 (45.0) | 5.0 (41.0) | 5.6 (42.1) | 5.0 (41.0) | 6.1 (43.0) | 8.3 (46.9) |
| Mean daily maximum °C (°F) | 2.2 (36.0) | 1.7 (35.1) | 1.1 (34.0) | −1.7 (28.9) | −5.0 (23.0) | −6.1 (21.0) | −7.2 (19.0) | −7.8 (18.0) | −6.1 (21.0) | −2.2 (28.0) | −0.6 (30.9) | 1.7 (35.1) | −2.5 (27.5) |
| Daily mean °C (°F) | 0.3 (32.5) | −0.3 (31.5) | −0.8 (30.6) | −3.6 (25.5) | −7.5 (18.5) | −9.2 (15.4) | −10.6 (12.9) | −11.7 (10.9) | −10.0 (14.0) | −5.6 (21.9) | −3.6 (25.5) | −0.6 (30.9) | −5.3 (22.5) |
| Mean daily minimum °C (°F) | −1.7 (28.9) | −2.2 (28.0) | −2.8 (27.0) | −5.6 (21.9) | −10.0 (14.0) | −12.2 (10.0) | −13.9 (7.0) | −15.6 (3.9) | −13.9 (7.0) | −8.9 (16.0) | −6.7 (19.9) | −2.8 (27.0) | −8.0 (17.6) |
| Record low °C (°F) | −8.3 (17.1) | −8.9 (16.0) | −12.8 (9.0) | −16.7 (1.9) | −29.4 (−20.9) | −33.9 (−29.0) | −36.1 (−33.0) | −36.1 (−33.0) | −38.9 (−38.0) | −27.8 (−18.0) | −22.2 (−8.0) | −10.6 (12.9) | −38.9 (−38.0) |
| Average precipitation mm (inches) | 22.9 (0.90) | 73.7 (2.90) | 50.8 (2.00) | 71.1 (2.80) | 20.3 (0.80) | 33.0 (1.30) | 22.9 (0.90) | 27.9 (1.10) | 53.3 (2.10) | 25.4 (1.00) | 10.2 (0.40) | 48.3 (1.90) | 460.0 (18.11) |
Source: Sistema de Clasificación Bioclimática Mundial

== List of islands ==
- Galindez Island
- Skua Island (Antarctica)
- Forge Islands
- Ambrose Rocks
- Anvil Rock
- Barros Rocks
- Black Island (Wilhelm Archipelago)
- Black Island Channel
- Bloor Passage
- Channel Rock (Argentine Islands)
- Corner Island (Antarctica)
- Corner Rock
- Cornice Channel
- Drum Rock
- Fanfare Island
- Finger Point (Wilhelm Archipelago)
- Frost Rocks
- Goudier Island
- Green Glacier
- Grotto Island
- Indicator Island
- Irizar Island
- Leopard Island
- Marina Point
- Meek Channel
- Melchior Base
- Navy Point
- Nicholl Head
- Runciman Rock
- Shelter Islands
- Skua Creek
- Smooth Island (Antarctica)
- Stella Creek
- The Barchans
- The Buttons
- Three Little Pigs (islands)
- Thumb Rock
- Uruguay Island
- Whiting Rocks
- Winter Island (Antarctica)
- Woozle Hill

== See also ==
- List of Antarctic and subantarctic islands
