= Irizar Island =

Island in Wilhelm Archipelago, Antarctica

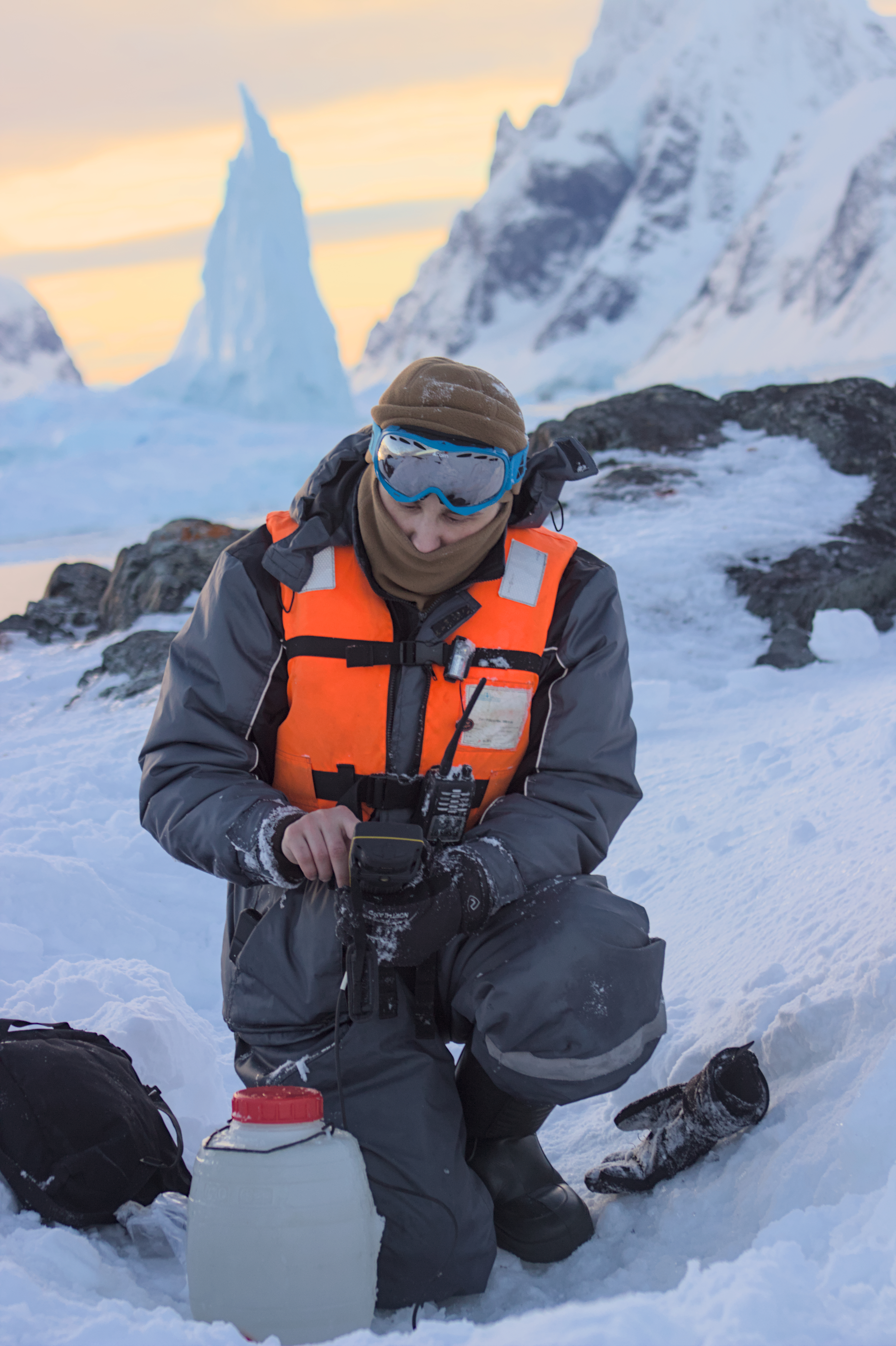
Dr. Serhii Yermolenko, a biologist of the 29th Ukrainian Antarctic Expedition, takes water samples from a freshwater lake on Irizar Island

Irizar Island (65°13′S 64°12′W) is an island 0.8 km (0.5 mi) long, lying 0.80 km (0.5 mi) northeast of Uruguay Island in the northeastern part of the Argentine Islands, in the Wilhelm Archipelago, Antarctica. It was discovered by the French Antarctic Expedition, 1903–05, under Jean-Baptiste Charcot, and named by him for Captain Julián Irízar of the Argentine Navy. The island was recharted in 1935 by the British Graham Land Expedition under John Rymill.

== See also ==
- List of Antarctic and sub-Antarctic islands
