= Frost Rocks =

The Frost Rocks (65°16′S 64°20′W) are a cluster of rocks situated southwest of the southern Argentine Islands and 0.5 nautical miles (1 km) southwest of the Whiting Rocks, off the coast of Graham Land, Antarctica. They were named by the UK Antarctic Place-Names Committee for Richard Frost, a survey assistant of the Hydrographic Survey Unit from HMS Endurance working in the area in February 1969.
