= Whiting Rocks =

Whiting Rocks (65°15′S 64°20′W) is three rocks lying 0.5 nautical miles (0.9 km) south of The Barchans, Argentine Islands, off the coast of Graham Land. Named by United Kingdom Antarctic Place-Names Committee (UK-APC) for Colin S. Whiting, survey assistant of the Hydrographic Survey Unit from HMS Endurance working in the area in February 1969.
