= Barros Rocks =

- Location within Antarctica

Highest point
- Coordinates: 65°17′S 64°12′W

Geography
- Location: Wilhelm Archipelago

The Barros Rocks are a group of rocks between the Berthelot Islands and the Argentine Islands, lying 2 nautical miles (4 km) southwest of Cape Tuxen off the west coast of Graham Land. They were discovered by the French Antarctic Expedition, 1908–10, under Jean-Baptiste Charcot, and named after Captain Barros Cobra, a Brazilian naval officer at Rio de Janeiro, who assisted the expedition.
