= Uruguay Island =

Island of Antarctica

- Location within Antarctica

Geography
- Location: Antarctica
- Coordinates: 65°14′S 64°14′W
- Length: 1 km (0.6 mi)

Administration
- Administered under the Antarctic Treaty System

Demographics
- Population: Uninhabited

Uruguay Island is an island 1 km (0.62 mi) long with a cove indenting its west side, lying between Irizar Island and Corner Island in the Argentine Islands of the Wilhelm Archipelago of Antarctica. It was discovered by the French Antarctic Expedition of 1903–05, under J.B. Charcot who named it after the Argentine corvette ARA Uruguay. The island was recharted in 1935 by the British Graham Land Expedition (BGLE) under John Rymill.

== Important Bird Area ==
The island has been designated an Important Bird Area (IBA) by BirdLife International because it supports a breeding colony of about 200 pairs of imperial shags.

== See also ==
- List of Antarctic and Subantarctic islands
