= Rasmussen Island =

Island on the coast of Graham Land, Antarctica

Rasmussen Island (65°15′S 64°5′W) is a small island in the north part of Waddington Bay, on the west coast of Graham Land. The north entrance to Waddington Bay was named "Cap Rasmussen" by the Belgian Antarctic Expedition, 1897–99, under Gerlache, but air photos show no significant point there which can be reidentified without ambiguity. To preserve the original name in the vicinity, the United Kingdom Antarctic Place-Names Committee (UK-APC) in 1959 applied the name Rasmussen to this island.

== See also ==
- List of Antarctic and sub-Antarctic islands
