= Julián Irízar =

Argentine admiral (1869–1935)

Julián Irizar
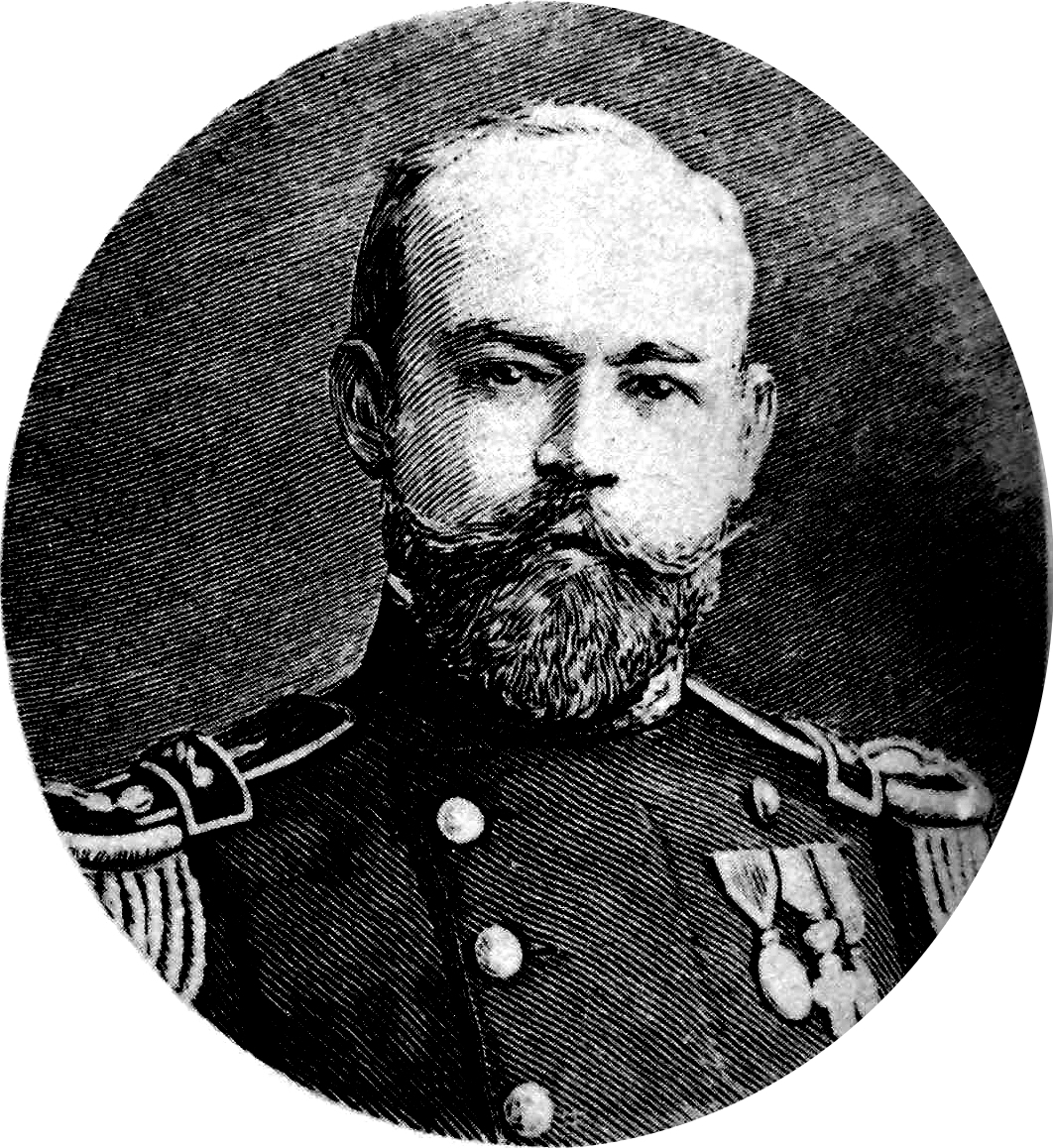
- Julian Irizar as Admiral
- Born: 7 January 1869; Capilla del Señor, Buenos Aires Province, Argentina
- Died: 17 March 1935 (aged 66); Buenos Aires
- Burial place: Recoleta Cemetery, Buenos Aires
- Military career
- Allegiance: Argentina
- Branch: Argentine Navy
- Service years: 1884–1932
- Rank: Vice Admiral (Equivalent of U.S.A. Rear Admiral)
- Commands: ARA Uruguay; Supervised modernization of battleships Mariano Moreno and Bernado Rivadavia in the United States; Promoted to Vice Admiral 1926, Appointed National Maritime Prefect 1932; Chaired Naval Center for two years starting 1931

Admiral Julián Irízar (Capilla del Señor, Buenos Aires Province, January 7, 1869 – March 17, 1935) was an officer of the Argentine Navy. He became a key figure in the modernization of the navy's fleet, the commander of the First Division of the Navy and later Naval Center President, but his most memorable action was as commander of the corvette Uruguay in the 1903 rescue of the Swedish Antarctic Expedition led by Otto Nordenskjöld, whose ship, the Antarctic, was destroyed by ice. At the time of the rescue he held the rank Capitán de Corbeta (Lieutenant Commander). (See ARA Uruguay for more information.)

== Early career ==
Irízar entered the Naval Academy on March 11, 1884.

In 1898 he was part of the commission to monitor construction of the frigate ARA Presidente Sarmiento in England. When in 1899 that ship embarked on its first voyage of circumnavigation, he was an officer of the staff of the ship. Becoming a specialist in explosives, he then took postings as naval attaché at the diplomatic missions in Britain and Germany, and as purchasing agent for the Navy for ammunition and artillery materials.

== Later career ==
Irizar was promoted to Capitán de Fragata (Commander) following the rescue of the Swedish Expedition.

- He led the Argentine delegation to the Naval Commission in Europe after World War I. Upon returning was promoted to admiral (U.S.A equivalent Commodore) and appointed to head Naval Division I.
- In 1923 he was posted to the supervision of the modernization of battleships ARA Moreno and ARA Rivadavia in the United States.
- In 1926 he was promoted to vice admiral and in 1932 appointed the National Maritime Prefect.
- Since April 16 of 1931 and for two years he chaired the Naval Center.

He retired on January 8 of 1932, and died four years later.

== Tributes ==
- An icebreaker of the Argentine Navy is named ARA Almirante Irízar in his honor.
- Jean-Baptiste Charcot dubbed "Islands Argentinas" one archipelago next to Graham Land, near the Palmer Archipelago, one of which is called Irízar Island and another Uruguay Island, after his ship.
- Cape Irizar on Lamplugh Island in Antarctica is named after him.

== Images ==
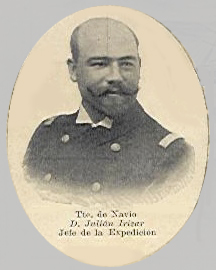
Julián Irízar as ARA Capitán de Corbeta (Lieutenant Commander) ca. 1903

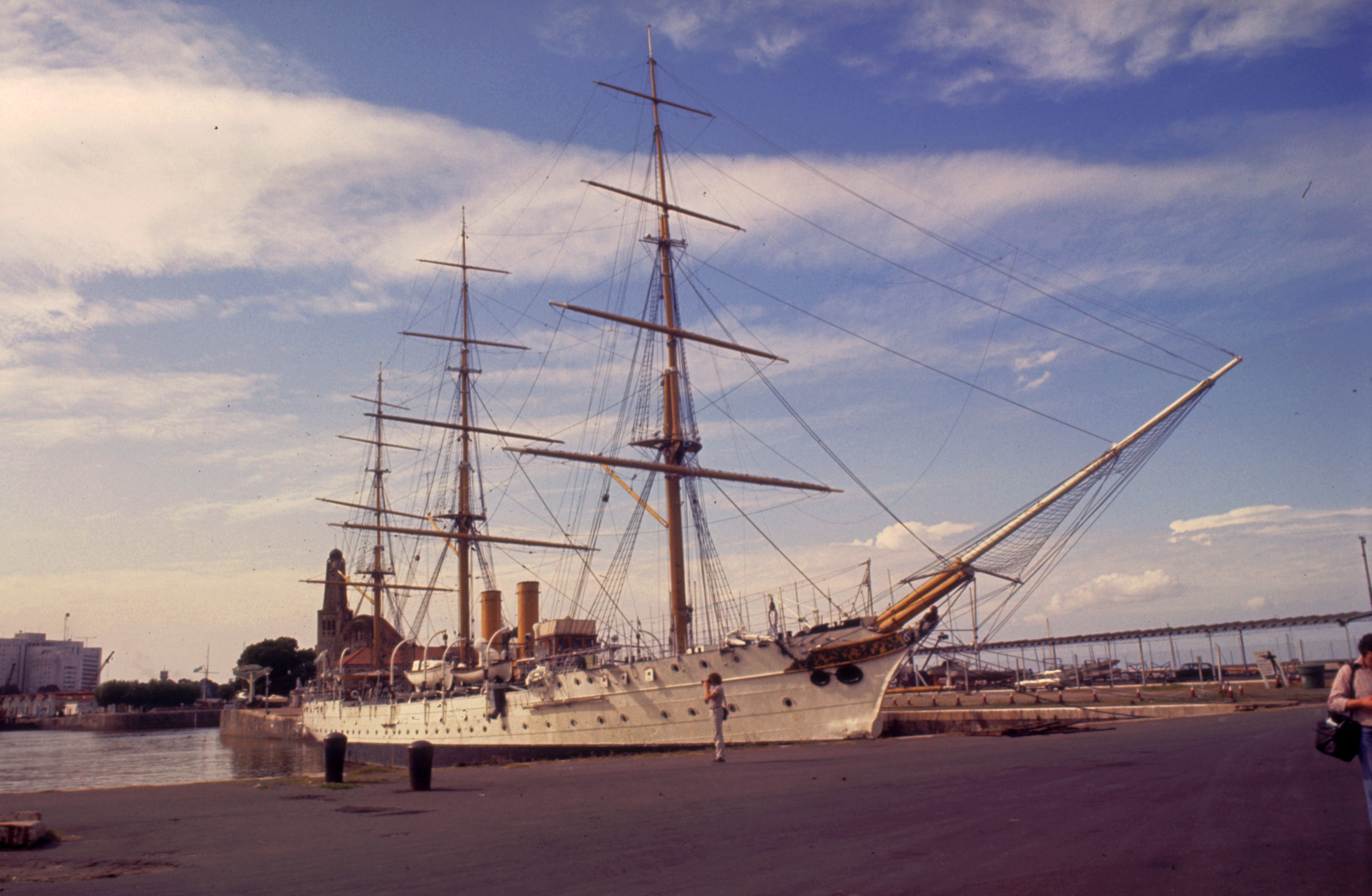
Frigate Presidente Sarmiento, upon which he served as staff officer

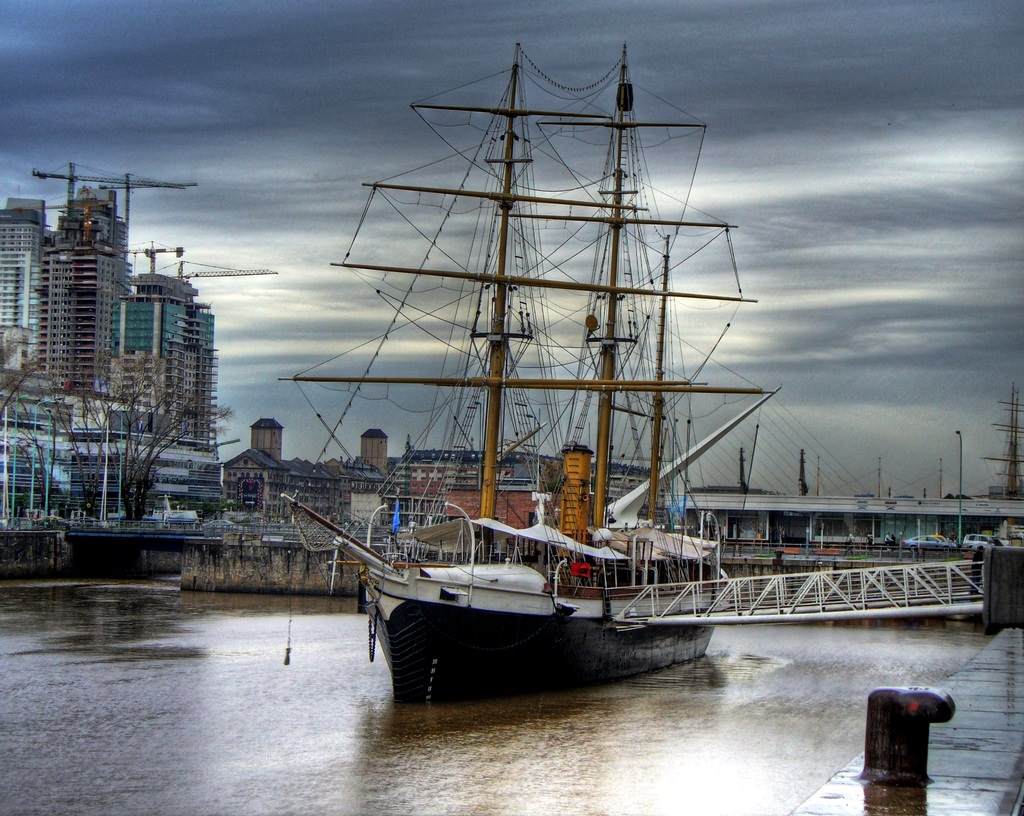
Corvette Uruguay, his most famous command

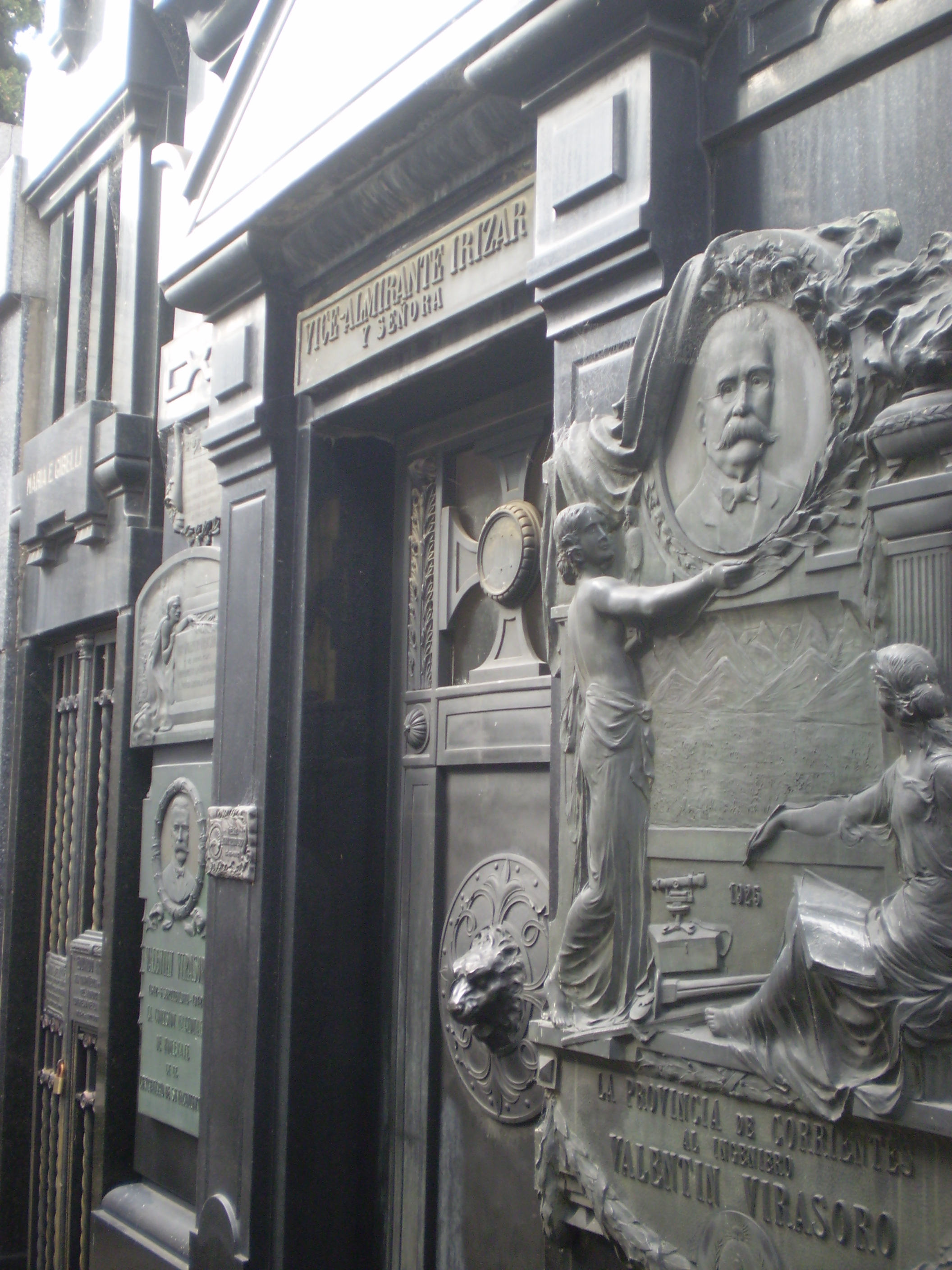
His grave at La Recoleta Cemetery
