= Forge Islands =

Island group in Wilhelm Archipelago, Antarctica

The Forge Islands (65°14′S 64°17′W) are a group of small islands lying northeast of The Barchans and 0.5 nautical miles (1 km) northwest of Grotto Island, in the Argentine Islands, Wilhelm Archipelago. They were charted and named the "Horseshoe Islands" by the British Graham Land Expedition under John Rymill, 1934–37. The name was changed by the UK Antarctic Place-Names Committee in 1959 to avoid confusion with Horseshoe Island in Marguerite Bay. This new name arises from association with the old name and with nearby Anvil Rock.

== See also ==
- List of Antarctic and sub-Antarctic islands
