= Petermann Island =

Island of Antarctica

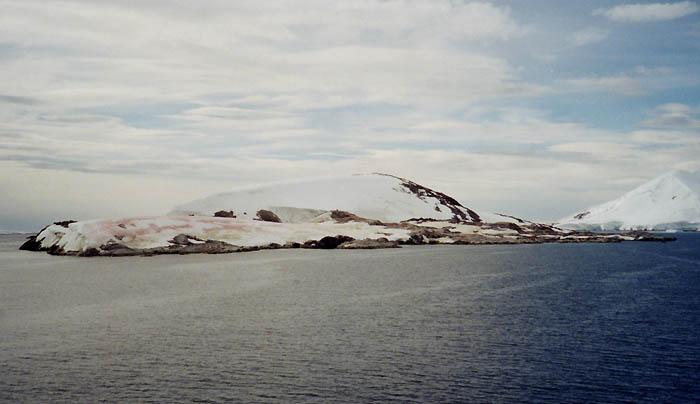
- Petermann Island from a distance

- Location of Petermann Island Petermann Island (Antarctic Peninsula)

Geography
- Location: Antarctica
- Coordinates: 65°10′S 64°10′W
- Length: 2 km (1.2 mi)

Administration
- Antarctica
- Administered under the Antarctic Treaty System

Petermann Island (65°10′S 64°10′W) is an island 1 nautical mile (1.9 km; 1.2 mi) long, lying 1 nautical mile (1.9 km; 1.2 mi) southwest of Hovgaard Island in the Wilhelm Archipelago, Antarctica.

== Location ==
Graham Coast, Antarctic Peninsula. Petermann Island near the east end

Petermann Island is off the Graham Coast of the Antarctic Peninsula. It is in the Wilhelm Archipelago, southwest of Hovgaard Island and Booth Island, east of the Vedel Islands and northeast of the French Passage. It is northwest of Mount Shackleton on the mainland.

The island is 1.8 km (1.1 mi) long and 1.2 km (0.75 mi) across. It rises steeply to elevations of up to 250 m (820 ft) from a rocky coastline with raised pebble beaches. It has volcanic origins, with about half the land surface covered by a permanent, crevassed icecap. Ice-free areas have a sparse vegetation of mosses and lichens. The bedrock of the island is granodiorite.

== Important Bird Area ==
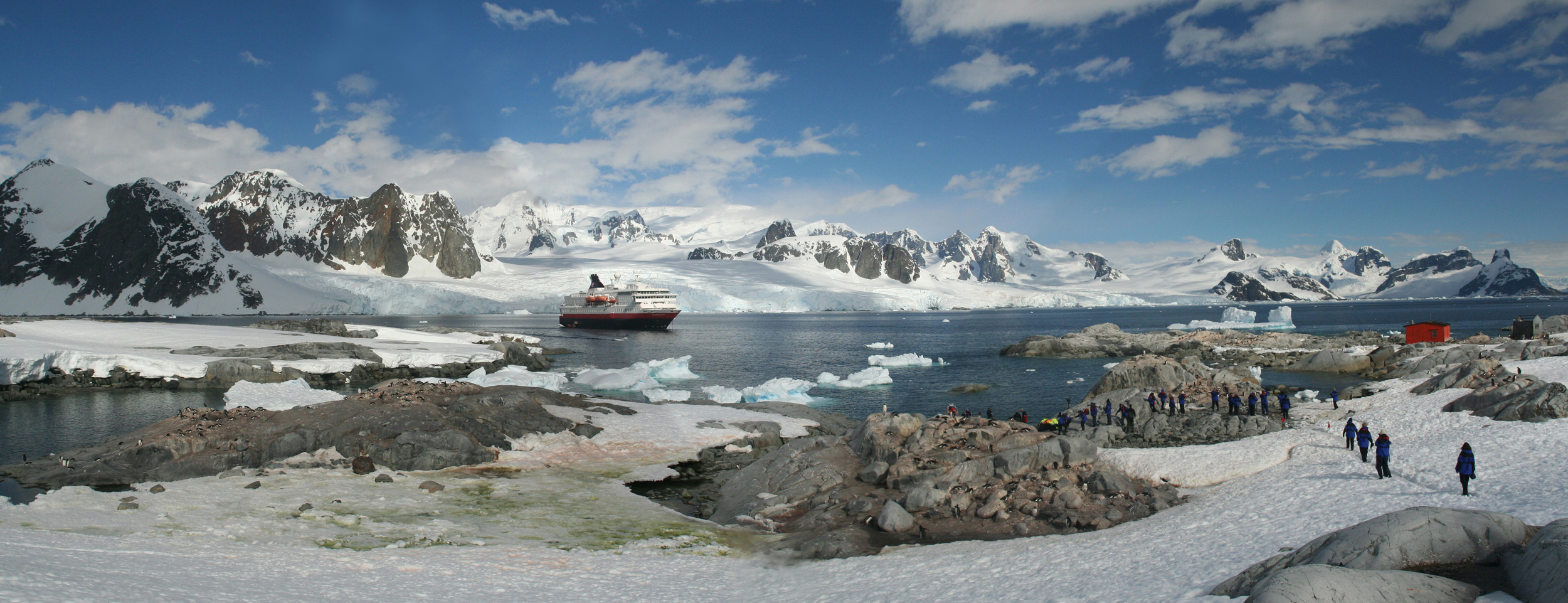
Penguin colonies, cruise ship and tourists

The island has been identified as an Important Bird Area (IBA) by BirdLife International because it supports a breeding colony of about 3,000 pairs of gentoo penguins. Other birds nesting at the site in smaller numbers include Adélie penguins, imperial shags, Wilson's storm petrels and south polar skuas.

== Sailing directions ==
The US Defense Mapping Agency's Sailing Directions for Antarctica (1976) describes Petermann Island as follows:

PETERMANN ISLAND (Lund Island) 65°10'S., 64°09'W.) lies about 1 mile south-southwestward from Hovgaard Island, is about 1 mile in length and half as broad. Clayton Hill, a rocky mass 436 feet high, located in the northern portion of the Island, marks the highest elevation. An Iron post BEACON having a yellow and black banded cylindrical topmark stands on Clayton Hill. A beacon also stands on the southern end of the Island.

This peak is flanked on each side by low peninsulas deeply cut by small fiords. The Southwest fiord, although offering depths of 6.4m (3 1/2 fm) to 23.8m (13 fm) is not a favorable harbor because heavy swells enter as well as much drift ice. The ice cliffs at the head of the fiord frequently calve making the anchorage uncomfortable for vessels. The Ice cliffs offer no shore anchorage for moorings. The Northeast fiord offers depths of 15.5m (8 1/2 fm) but is open to prevailing winds, and ice blocks the fiord at each storm.

The eastern fiord Is called Port Circumcision (Port Circoncision), and It was here that Dr. Charcot wintered the Pourquoi Pas in 1909, Two shoals with 2.7m (1 1/2 fm) of water over them lie to northward and to southward of the entrance of the harbor but do not obstruct the entrance. Vessels entering should approach from the southeastward and steer to enter midway between the entrance points; the channel between the flanking shoals has a minimum depth of 8.2m (4 1/2 fm).

The harbor offers a shelter for small vessels which may be moored alongside the rocky shores in the head of the fiord, where depths of 5.5m (3 fm) to 8.2m (4 1/2 fm) are found. Vessels wintering in this site should moor by anchor cable to suitable points on the shore as well as taking anchorage underfoot. Barriers of chain should be erected across the harbor entrance to prevent damage to the vessel by drifting ice. At least one fathom of water should be kept under the vessel for waves several feet high have been experienced here as well as a strong undertow. The fiord is exposed to northeast winds, and is not recommended for winter quarters.

An Argentine station is located on the southern shore of Port Circumcision.

== History ==
Petermann Island was discovered by a German expedition 1873–74, and named by Eduard Dallmann for August Petermann, noted German geographer and founder of Petermanns Mitteilungen. The United States Advisory Committee on Antarctic Names (US-ACAN) has rejected the name Lund Island, applied by the Belgian Antarctic Expedition (BelgAE), 1897–99, in favor of the original naming. The French Antarctic Expedition (FrAE) of 1908-10 under Jean-Baptiste Charcot wintered over aboard ship in a cove on the southeast side of the island, named Port Circumcision because it was spotted 1 January 1909, the traditional day for the Feast of the Circumcision. Huts built by the expedition are gone, although a cairn remains, along with a refuge hut built by Argentina in 1955, and a cross commemorating three members of the British Antarctic Survey who died in a 1982 attempt to cross the sea ice from Petermann to Faraday Station.

=== Megalestris Hill Cairn ===
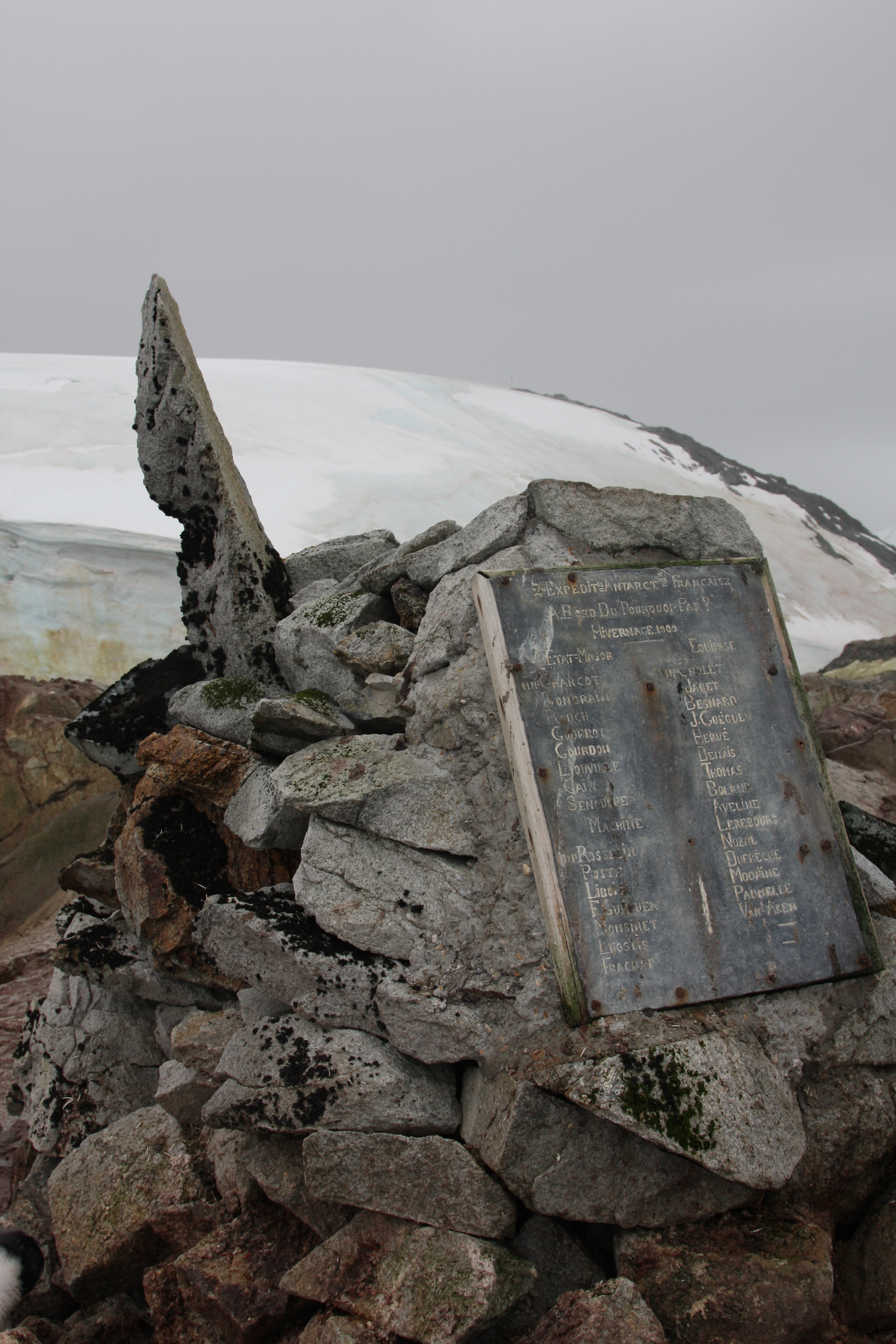
Plaque at the summit of Petermann Island. Lists crew members of 1908-1910 Charcot expedition on the Pourquoi pas IV

A cairn with a lead plaque was erected on Megalestris Hill in 1909. The original plaque has since been removed to the Museum National d’Histoire Naturelle in Paris, but the cairn, with a replica plaque, has been designated a Historic Site or Monument (HSM 27), following a proposal by Argentina, France and the United Kingdom to the Antarctic Treaty Consultative Meeting.

=== Groussac Refuge ===
Groussac Refuge (65°10′33″S 64°08′10″W) is an Argentine naval refuge (originally called Hippolyte Bouchard) in Antarctica, located on the southern coast of the Port Circumcision, on Petermann Island. The refuge was inaugurated on February 6, 1955, and is operated by the Argentine Navy and was occupied periodically by personnel of the British Antarctic Survey of the former Faraday Station. The refuge is in the middle of a colony of Gentoo penguins. Its current name is in honour of Paul Groussac, a French writer and historian who lived in Argentina and authored a plea on the Argentine claim of the Malvinas Islands and biographies of Argentine national heroes.

== Features ==
=== Rouch Point ===
65°10′S 64°11′W. A point forming the northwest end of Petermann Island,. Charted by the FrAE, 1908–10, and named by Charcot for Jules Rouch, sub-lieutenant of the Pourquoi-Pas?, who was responsible for the study of meteorology, atmospheric electricity and oceanography on the expedition.

=== Godfroy Point ===
65°10′S 64°10′W. A point which marks the north extremity of Petermann Island. Discovered by the FrAE, 1908–10, and named by Charcot for René Godfrey, sub-lieutenant on the Pourquoi-Pas?, who was responsible for the expedition's study of tides and the atmosphere.

=== Liouville Point ===
65°10′S 64°09′W. A point marking the northeast end of Petermann Island. Discovered by the FrAE, 1908–10, and named by Charcot for J. Liouville, assistant medical officer and zoologist of the expedition.

=== Depeaux Point ===
65°11′S 64°10′W. A point forming the south end of Petermann Island. Discovered and named by the FrAE, 1908–10, under Charcot.

=== Port Circumcision ===
65°11′S 64°10′W. A cove indenting the southeast side of Petermann Island. Discovered on January 1, 1909, by the FrAE under Charcot, who named it for the holy day on which it was first sighted. The cove served as a base for the ship Pourquoi-Pas? during the 1909 winter season.

=== Clayton Hill ===
65°11′S 64°10′W. A hill, 125 metres (410 ft) high, in the north-central part of Petermann Island. First charted and named by the FrAE, 1908–10, under Charcot.

=== Megalestris Hill ===
65°11′S 64°10′W. A rocky hill, 35 metres (115 ft) high, in the south part of Petermann Island. First charted and named by the FrAE, 1908–10, under Charcot. Megalestris is an obsolete generic name for the South polar skua.

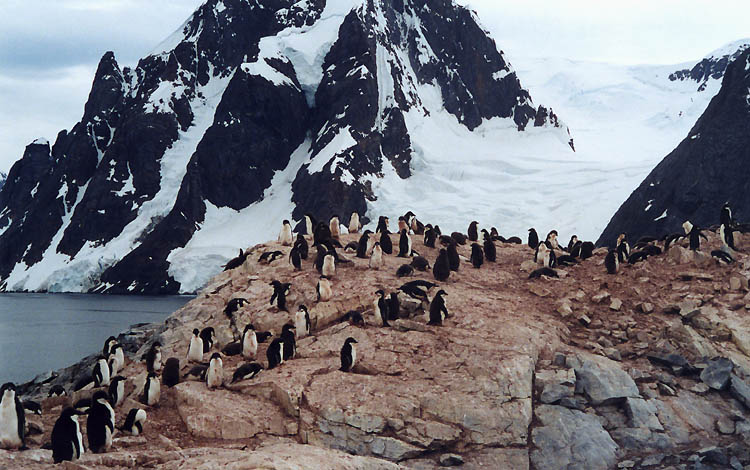
Adélie penguin rookery on Petermann Island; their droppings make the grey rock pinkish

== Nearby features ==
=== Herald Reef ===
65°11′S 64°11′W. A reef 1 nautical mile (1.9 km; 1.2 mi) southwest of Petermann Island, lying on the north side of French Passage in the Wilhelm Archipelago. First charted by the FrAE under Charcot, 1908–10. So named by the UK-APC in 1959 because this reef heralds the approach to French Passage from the east.

=== Barbière Island ===
65°11′S 64°10′W. A small island, the southeasternmost of the islands lying off the south end of Petermann Island. Charted by the FrAE, 1908–10, and named after M. Barbière, one of the port engineers at Recife (Pernambuco), who assisted the expedition in 1910.

=== Charlat Island ===
65°11′S 64°10′W. A small island lying immediately west of the south end of Petermann Island. Discovered by the FrAE, 1908–10, and named by Charcot for Monsieur Charlat, then French Vice-Consul in Rio de Janeiro.

=== Thiébault Island ===
65°11′S 64°11′W. A small island which lies next west of Charlat Island in the small group off the south end of Petermann Island. Discovered by the FrAE, 1908–10, and named by Charcot for Monsieur Thiébault, then French Minister to Argentina.

=== Boudet Island ===
65°11′S 64°10′W. The largest of several small islands lying off the south end of Petermann Island. Discovered by the FrAE, 1908–10, and named by Charcot, probably for Monsieur Boudet, then French Consul in Brazil.

=== Bazzano Island ===
65°11′S 64°10′W. A small island lying off the south end of Petermann Island, between Lisboa Island and Boudet Island. Discovered and named by the FrAE, 1908–10, under Charcot.

=== Lisboa Island ===
65°11′S 64°11′W. The southwesternmost of the small islands lying off the south end of Petermann Island. Discovered and named by the FrAE, 1908–10, under Charcot.

== Sources ==
- Alberts, Fred G., ed. (1995), Geographic Names of the Antarctic (PDF) (2 ed.), United States Board on Geographic Names This article incorporates public domain material from websites or documents of the United States Board on Geographic Names.
- Graham Land and South Shetland Islands, BAS: British Antarctic Survey, 2005
- List of Historic Sites and Monuments approved by the ATCM (2012) (PDF), Antarctic Treaty Secretariat, 2012
- "Petermann Island", BirdLife data zone, BirdLife International
- Sailing Directions for Antarctica: Includes Islands South of Latitude 60.̊, United States. Defense Mapping Agency. Hydrographic Center, 1976 This article incorporates public domain material from websites or documents of the National Geospatial-Intelligence Agency.
- Woo, Ming-ko (2012-04-14), Permafrost Hydrology, Springer Science & Business Media, ISBN 978-3-642-23462-0
