= Vernadsky Research Base =

Vernadsky Research Base Академік Вернадський Faraday Station (until 1996)
- Antarctic research station
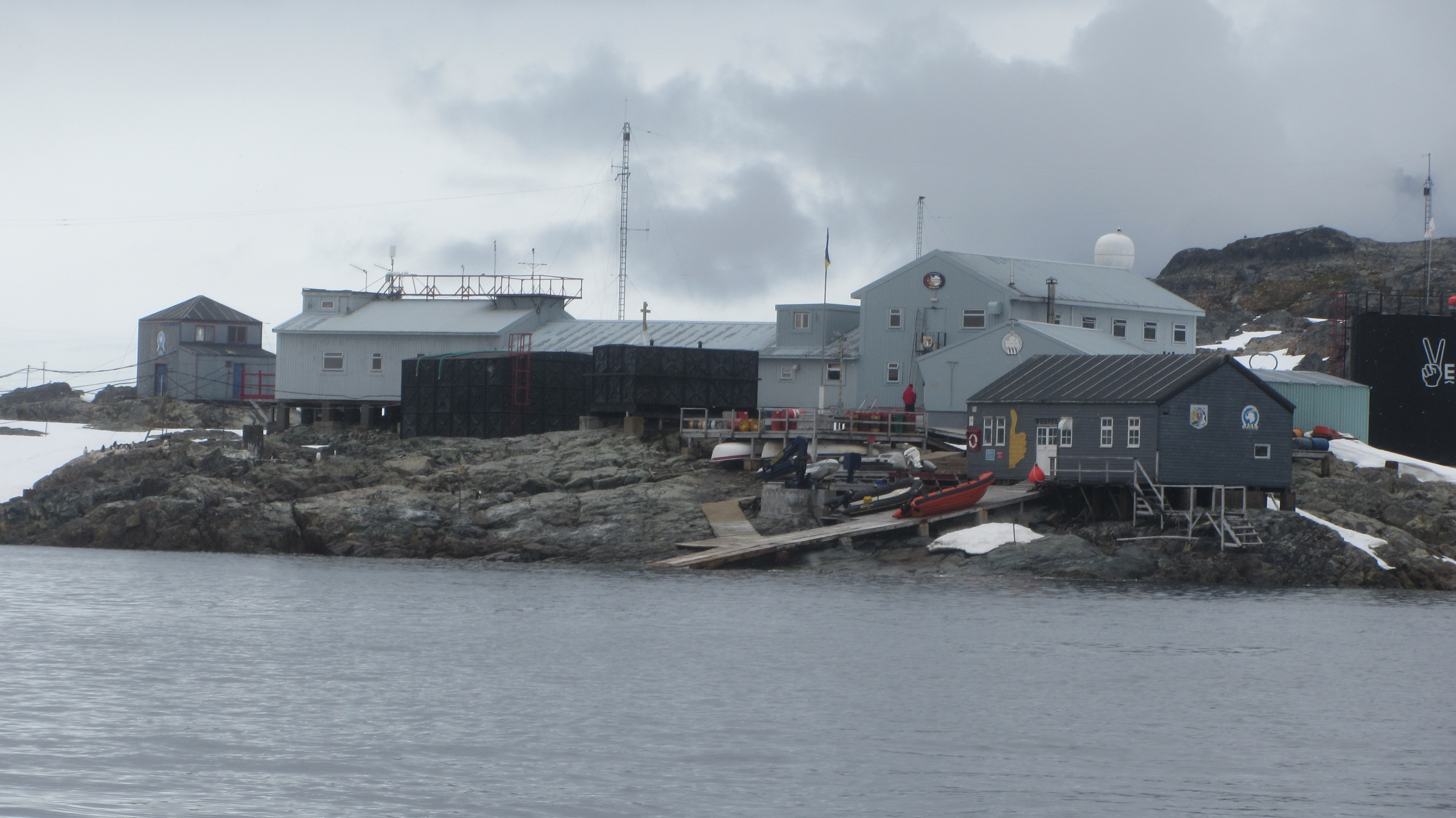
- The base in January 2014

- Location in Antarctica
- Coordinates: 65°14′45″S 64°15′28″W
- Region: Antarctic Peninsula
- Location: Marina Point
- Established: 7 January 1947
- Transferred: 6 February 1996
- Named for: Vladimir Vernadsky

Government
  - Type: Administration
  - Body: NANC, Ukraine
- Elevation: 7 m (23 ft)

Population (2017)
  - Summer: 30
  - Winter: 12
- Time zone: UTC-3 (ART)
- UN/LOCODE: AQ VKY
- Active times: All year-round
- Activities: List: Climatology; Geology; Geophysics; Marine biology; Oceanography
- Website: uac.gov.ua

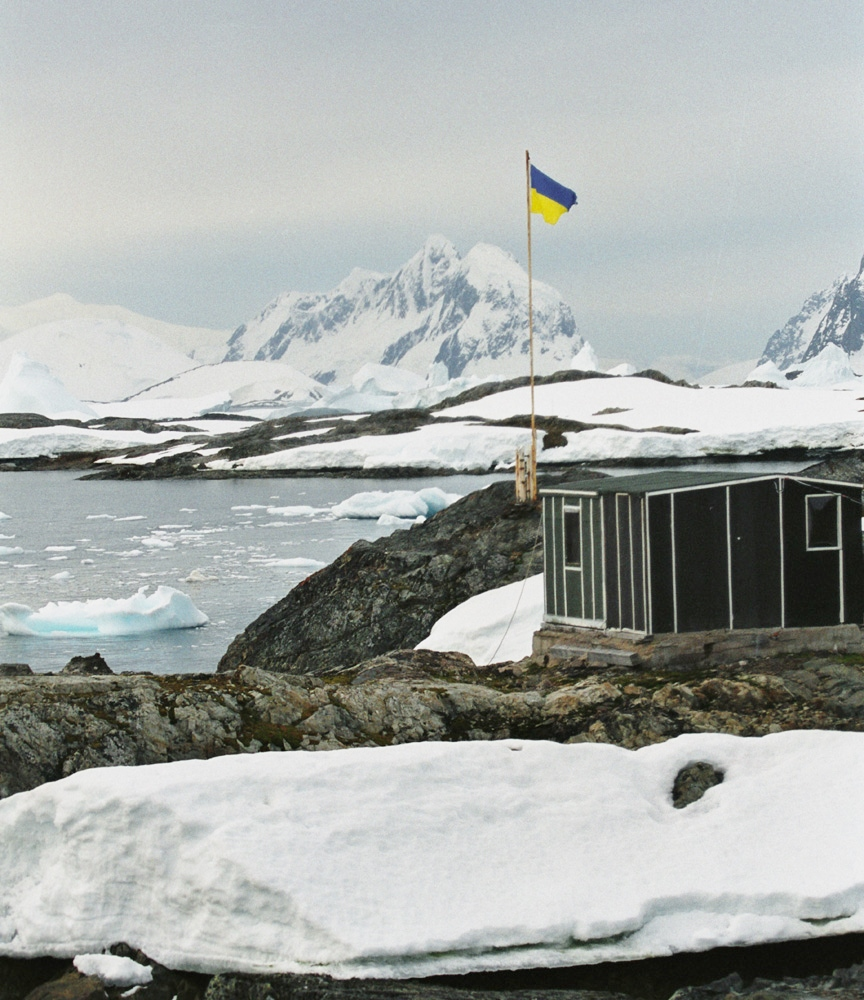

The Vernadsky Research Base (Ukrainian: Антарктична станція Академік Вернадський, romanized: Antarktychna stantsiia Akademik Vernadskyi) is a Ukrainian Antarctic research station at Marina Point on Galindez Island in the Argentine Islands, not far from Kyiv Peninsula. The region is under territorial claims between three countries (see Territorial claims in Antarctica). The single Ukrainian Antarctic station is named after the mineralogist Vladimir Vernadsky (1863–1945) who was the first president of the National Academy of Sciences of Ukraine.

A British research base was established in 1947 as Faraday Station (Station F) and transferred to Ukraine in 1996. Coordination and operational administration of the base is conducted by the National Antarctic Scientific Center of Ukraine which is part of Ministry of Education and Sciences of Ukraine.

The closest Antarctic stations are Palmer Station of the United States and Yelcho Base of Chile, reopened in 2015.

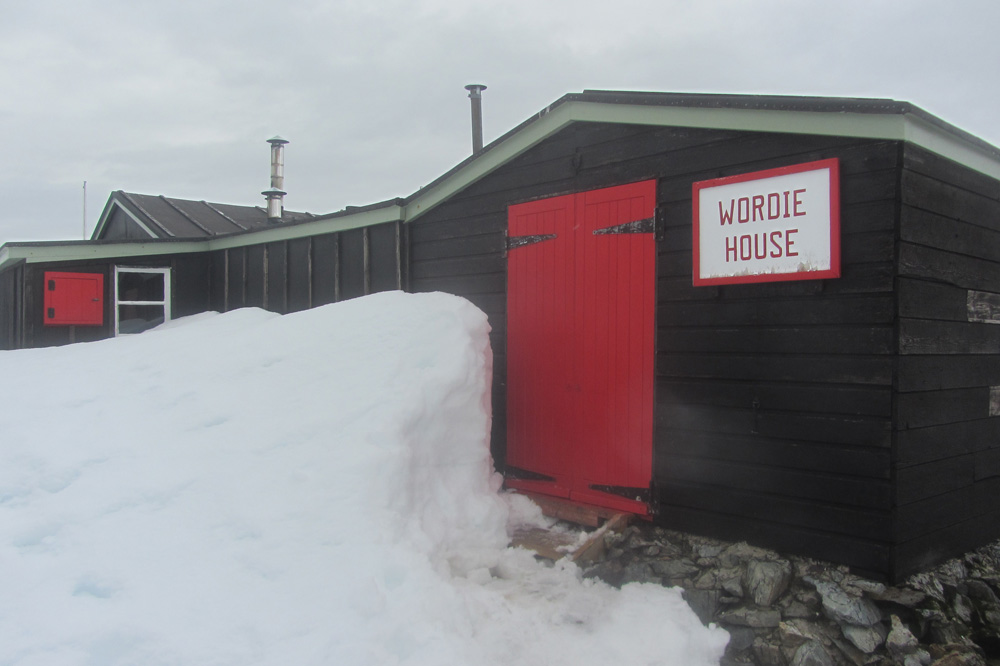
Wordie House

== History ==
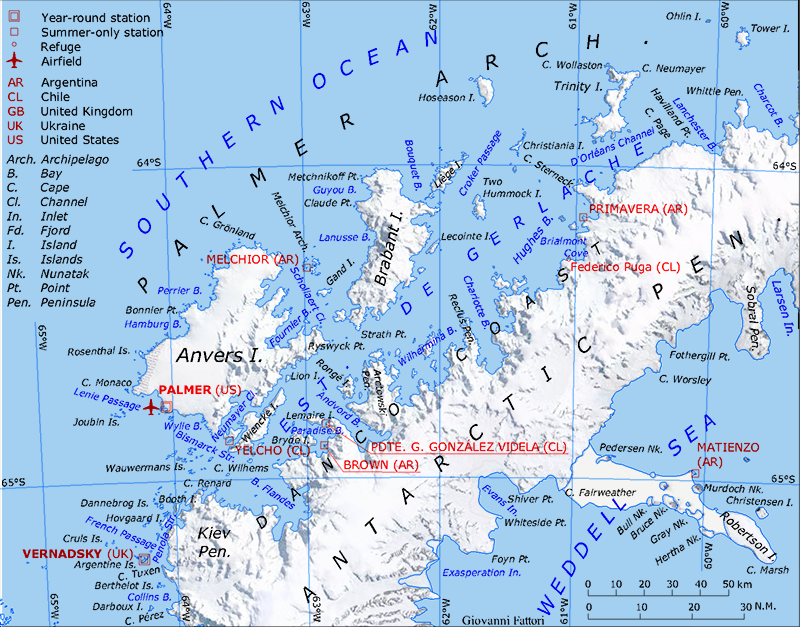
Map of Gerlache Strait region, Cartographic base: Antarctic Digital Database

=== British Faraday Station (Station F) ===
The research base was established in 1947 at the Wordie House site on Winter Island by the Falkland Islands Dependencies Survey (today British Antarctic Survey) as Argentine Islands. The Faraday Station existed for 49 years and 31 days (7 January 1947 – 6 February 1996) operated by FIDS and BAS. The primary purpose of the station was to research geophysics, meteorology, and ionospherics.

In May 1954 the base moved from Winter Island to the present site on adjacent Galindez Island where the main building was named "Coronation House" in honor of the 1953 coronation of Elizabeth II. The personnel of the British Argentine Islands station (later Faraday Station) sometimes used the Argentine Groussac refuge station at Petermann Island.

On 15 August 1977 it was renamed as Station F — Faraday after the Argentine Air Force established its own military base at Southern Thule in November 1976 (see Corbeta Uruguay base) during the 1970–1980s contestation of the region between Argentina and the United Kingdom. The British base was renamed Faraday Station in honour of British scientist Michael Faraday. In September 1976 at Rasmussen Island a memorial cross was planted in honour of G H Hargreaves, M A Walker and G J Whitfield. On 14 August 1982 another memorial cross was planted at Petermann Island in honor of A C Morgan, K P Ockleton and J Coll.

=== Ukrainian Vernadsky Station ===
In 1992, after the collapse of the Soviet Union, Russia declared itself the successor to all the Antarctic stations of the USSR and refused to transfer one of them to Ukraine. During February–August 1992, a number of initiative letters were sent by scientists and specialists, appeals of institutions and organizations to state bodies on the need to resume and continue Ukraine's activities in Antarctica.

On 3 July 1992 the President of Ukraine, Leonid Kravchuk, issued a decree on Ukraine's participation in Antarctic research. In August 1992 the Verkhovna Rada approved the documents on Ukraine's accession to the Antarctic Treaty, and on 26 October 1993 the Center for Antarctic Studies (later the Ukrainian Antarctic Center) was established, headed by Petro Gozhyk.

In November 1993, the United Kingdom circulated a proposal to the embassies to transfer the Faraday station on the island of Galindez to one of the states that did not yet have stations on the continent. This idea was picked up by Ukrainian diplomats - the then Ambassador of Ukraine to Britain Serhiy Komisarenko and Counselor of the Embassy for Science Roland Franco.

On 21 November 1994 the Renaissance Foundation allocated $12,000 for the Ukraine Returns to Antarctica project. On 20 July 1995, in London, Ambassador of Ukraine Serhiy Komisarenko signed an intergovernmental agreement, and Petro Gozhyk, Director of the CAD, signed a Memorandum between the CAD and the BAS on the transfer of the Faraday Antarctic Station to Ukraine no later than 31 March 1996.

Ukraine took over the operation of the base in February 1996. It was sold by the UK for the symbolic sum of one pound, although the sale saved the UK government the considerable expense of dismantling the base in keeping with good environmental practices. On 6 February 1996, at 6:45 p.m., a yellow and blue flag was solemnly raised above the station.

The first expedition was successful. For high professionalism shown in the extreme conditions of Antarctica in carrying out the tasks of the First Ukrainian Antarctic Expedition by the Decree of the President of Ukraine in April 1998 the Order of Merit of the III degree was awarded to G. P. Milinevsky (station chief), the Order of Courage of the III degree V. G. Bakhmutov (geophysics) and L. S. Govorukha (glaciologist). A monument with a list of participants of the First Antarctic Expedition remained at the station.

The National Antarctic Scientific Center of Ukraine continues a programme of meteorology, upper atmospheric physics, geomagnetism, ozone, seismology, glaciology, ecology, biology and physiology research. The purpose of the State Targeted Scientific and Technical Program for Antarctic Research for 2011–2020 is to ensure the conduct of basic and applied research in Antarctica, the effective operation of the Antarctic station "Academician Vernadsky", Ukraine's international obligations under the Antarctic Treaty and scientifically sound assessment of prospects for the development of biological and mineral resource potential of the region.

== Climate ==
The climate of the base is classified as marine subantarctic. The climate is strongly influenced by the surrounding Pacific Ocean, moderating winter and summer temperatures. Thus, winter temperatures rarely fall below −20 °C (−4 °F) owing to the warmer waters while in summer, the cool waters and snow cover causes temperatures to rarely reach above 0 °C (32 °F). The mean annual temperature is −4 °C (25 °F) although within the last decade, temperatures have risen with much of it in winter and autumn.

Being located in the west coast of the Antarctic Peninsula, the climate is dominated by the low pressure systems that develop over the Pacific Ocean and move eastwards towards the peninsula mountain range. This process leads to frequent precipitation and strong winds in the base. Unpredictable and short snowfalls and snowstorms occur often. On average, the base receives 300 days with snow per year. Anticyclone weather patterns caused by high pressure systems in the interior of Antarctica or from the north are rare. In the cases that they occur, when the weather is influenced by the high pressure system from the interior of the continent, cold air masses from the south moves northwards. This can occasionally lead to foggy conditions and hoarfrost.

=== Statistics ===
Climate data for Vernadsky Research Base
Month	Jan	Feb	Mar	Apr	May	Jun	Jul	Aug	Sep	Oct	Nov	Dec	Year
Record high °C (°F)	10.0 (50.0)	11.7 (53.1)	7.8 (46.0)	7.2 (45.0)	6.7 (44.1)	6.1 (43.0)	8.7 (47.7)	7.2 (45.0)	5.0 (41.0)	6.1 (43.0)	6.7 (44.1)	11.4 (52.5)	11.7 (53.1)
Mean daily maximum °C (°F)	2.6 (36.7)	2.4 (36.3)	0.9 (33.6)	−0.9 (30.4)	−2.4 (27.7)	−4.7 (23.5)	−5.0 (23.0)	−5.8 (21.6)	−4.1 (24.6)	−3.4 (25.9)	0.2 (32.4)	1.3 (34.3)	−1.8 (28.8)
Daily mean °C (°F)	1.4 (34.5)	1.1 (34.0)	−0.4 (31.3)	−1.9 (28.6)	−3.8 (25.2)	−6.5 (20.3)	−7.0 (19.4)	−8.1 (17.4)	−6.5 (20.3)	−5.1 (22.8)	−1.7 (28.9)	−0.1 (31.8)	−3.3 (26.1)
Mean daily minimum °C (°F)	0.3 (32.5)	0.4 (32.7)	−1.3 (29.7)	−3.1 (26.4)	−4.8 (23.4)	−7.7 (18.1)	−8.5 (16.7)	−9.9 (14.2)	−8.5 (16.7)	−7.2 (19.0)	−2.8 (27.0)	−1.1 (30.0)	−4.5 (23.9)
Record low °C (°F)	−10.6 (12.9)	−12.2 (10.0)	−16.1 (3.0)	−34.4 (−29.9)	−34.4 (−29.9)	−36.5 (−33.7)	−40.6 (−41.1)	−43.3 (−45.9)	−38.9 (−38.0)	−28.9 (−20.0)	−22.2 (−8.0)	−11.7 (10.9)	−43.3 (−45.9)
Average relative humidity (%)	87	84	81	84	81	79	80	81	84	83	83	86	83
Source: Deutscher Wetterdienst

== Infrastructure ==
=== Main complex ===
The station consists of nine buildings standing on rock foundations. A 1961 extension at the east end of the hut provided living quarters for 15 people. Major alterations in 1980 updated the living and working accommodation. A two-storey extension provides sleeping accommodation for 24 people, a clothing store, boiler room and reverse osmosis plant on the ground floor. Upstairs are a lounge, library, dining room, gift store and kitchen. Visitors could purchase $3 shots of horilka (made on the premises) up until 2016 in the lounge. The old part of the building is now mostly laboratories and work rooms, together with the surgery and washrooms. The generator shed was erected in 1978–79, with the old one now used as a frozen food store and a carpenter's workshop. Other buildings include two non-magnetic buildings, a balloon-launching shed (now skidoo garage), and a general store.

=== Wordie House ===
Not part of the current Ukrainian Research Base, yet associated with the history of preceding British Faraday Station, the Wordie House served as a foundation of new British Antarctic station. Built on the site of an earlier British Graham Land Expedition sometime in 1935–36, it was destroyed, possibly by a tsunami, in 1946. The hut was named "Wordie House" after Sir James Wordie, a member of 1914–16 Shackleton's Imperial Trans-Antarctic Expedition who visited during its construction.

To commemorate the historic landmark, on 19 May 1995 the Wordie House at Winter Island has been restored and designated as Historic Site and Monument No. 62. After Faraday base complex was transferred to Ukraine, the new Vernadsky base personnel continued to temporarily supervise the Wordie House.

In January 2007 the landmark was inspected by a conservation architect for BAS and since October 2009 the Wordie House is managed by the United Kingdom Antarctic Heritage Trust under a "Memorandum of Understanding" with BAS.

=== Rasmussen Hut ===
At Rasmussen Island there is a hut that was under official use from March 1984 to 6 February 1996. Currently it is considered as closed, yet used occasionally by Ukrainian personnel from Vernadsky Station as an emergency refuge shelter and for recreation.

== Operations ==
=== Climate research ===
As one of the longest operating bases in Antarctica, Vernadsky Station has been the subject of scientific research studies on long-term temperature trends that indicate global warming. A study published in the April 2013 issue of the International Journal of Climatology examined the daily observed temperature at the Faraday/Vernadsky station from 1947 to 2011. It concluded that “Faraday/Vernadsky is experiencing a significant warming trend of about 0.6°C/decade (1.1°F) over the last few decades. Concurrently, the magnitude of extremely cold temperatures has reduced.”

=== Postal services and tourism ===
Vernadsky Station operates several services for visiting tourists. A post office accepts postcards at a cost of US$2 each. This is one of only a few post offices where visitors may send mail from Antarctica. Stamps for letters cost $6. Mail will take several months to be delivered. In addition to selling postage and accepting outgoing mail, the post office sells commemorative postcards and envelopes for $2 to $3 each.

== Staff ==
The station hosts 10 staff members in the summer and 5 in the winter.

== In popular culture ==
The first Ukrainian expedition to the research base is featured in the Death and the Penguin (1996) novel by Ukrainian author Andrey Kurkov, which was one of the first internationally successful books of independent Ukraine, as well as its sequel Penguin Lost (2002).

On 6 February 2021 Google celebrated the Vernadsky Research Base with a Google Doodle.

== Gallery ==
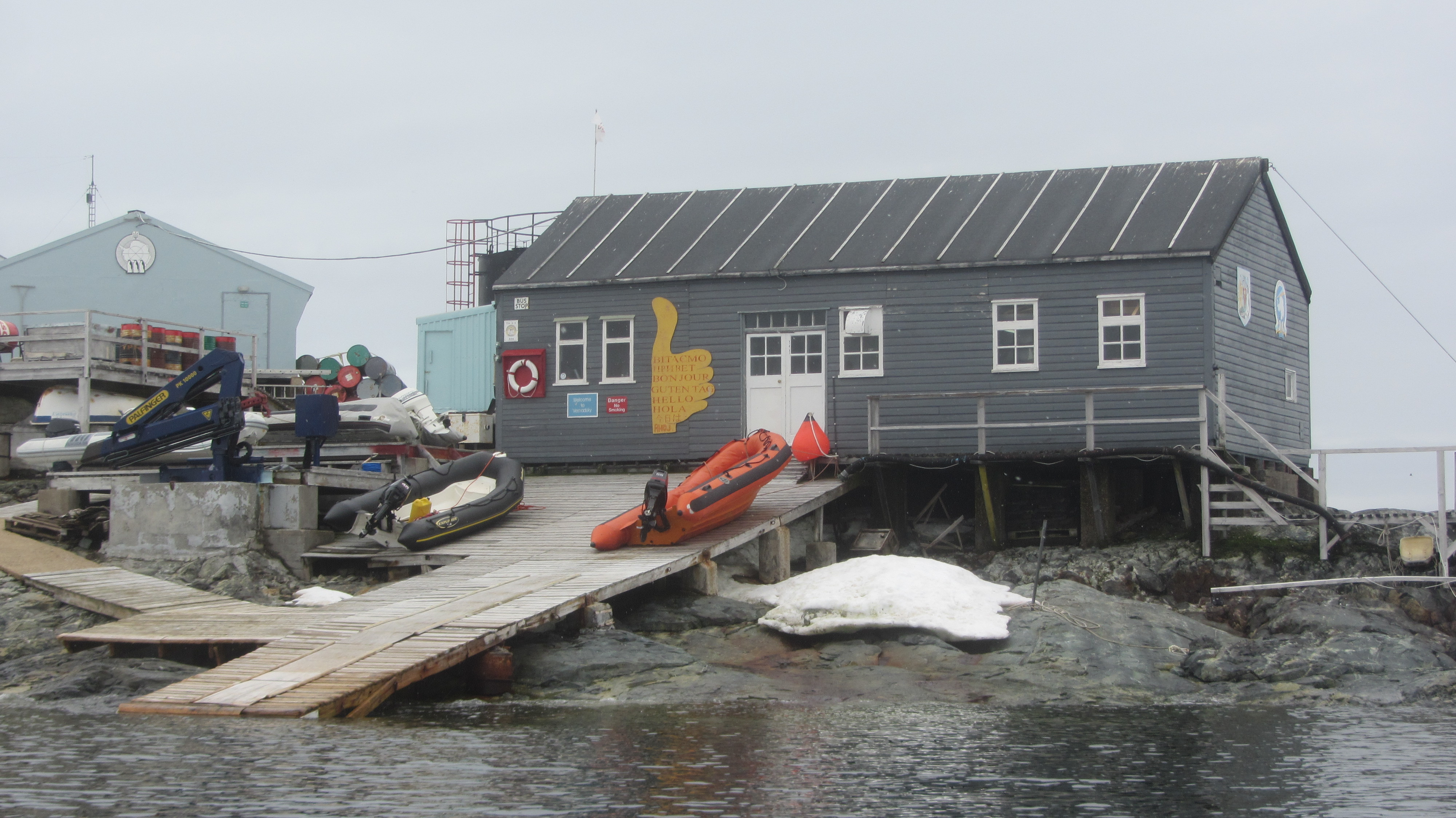
Wooden dock at Vernadsky Station

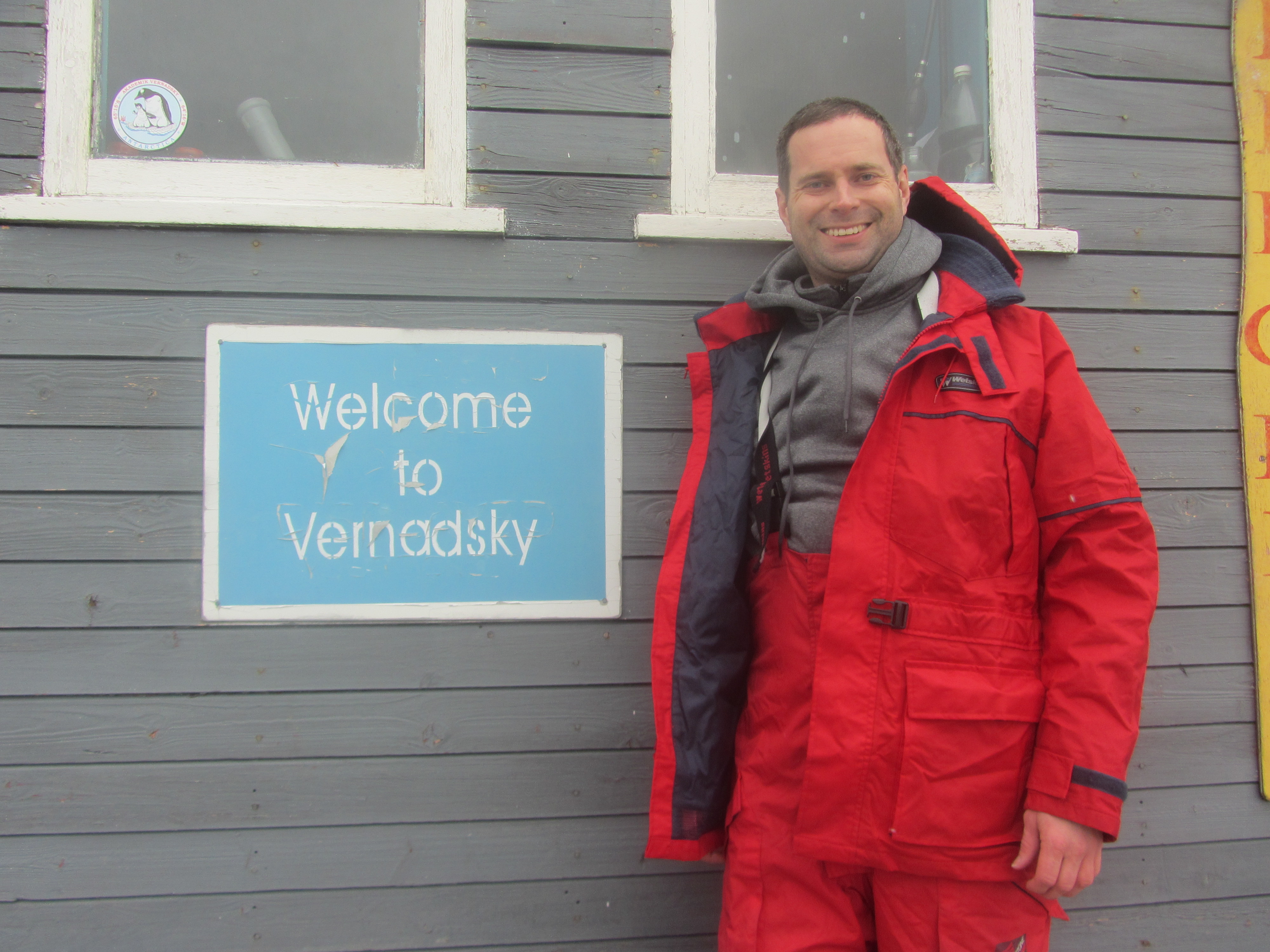
Welcome sign at Vernadsky Station

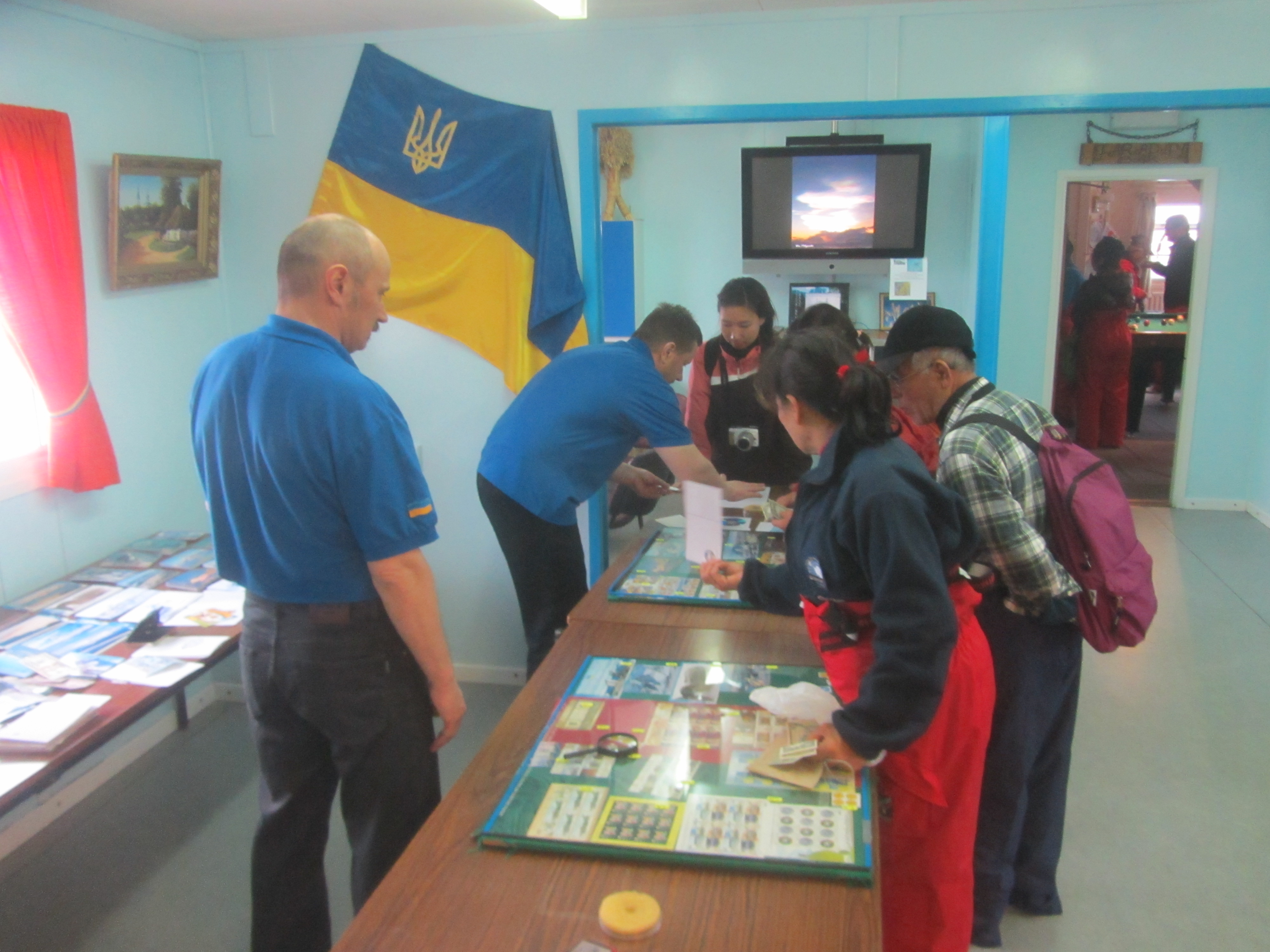
Tourists visit the post office inside Vernadsky Station.

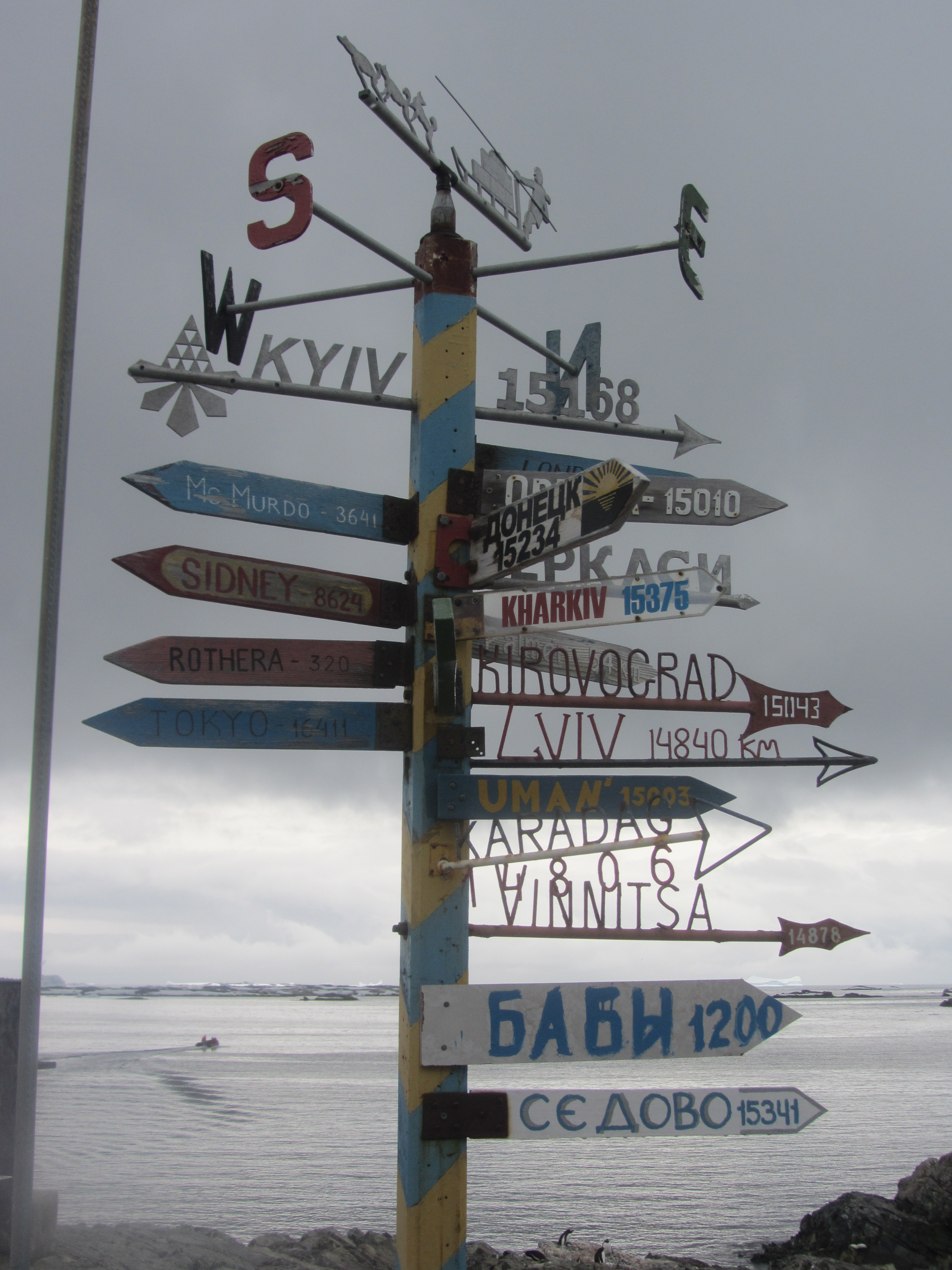
A signpost at Vernadsky Station displays distances to various cities.

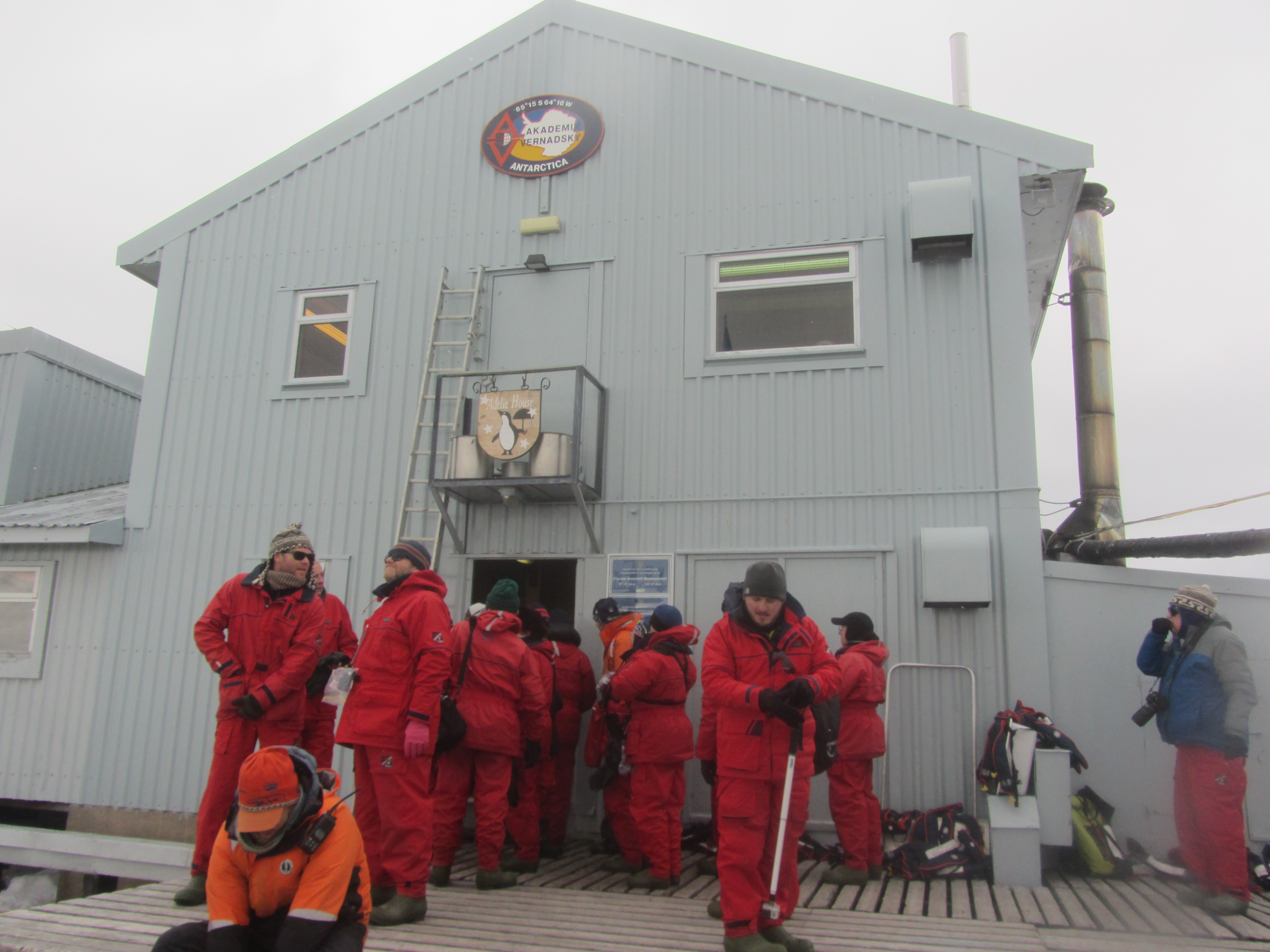
Tourists visit Vernadsky Station.

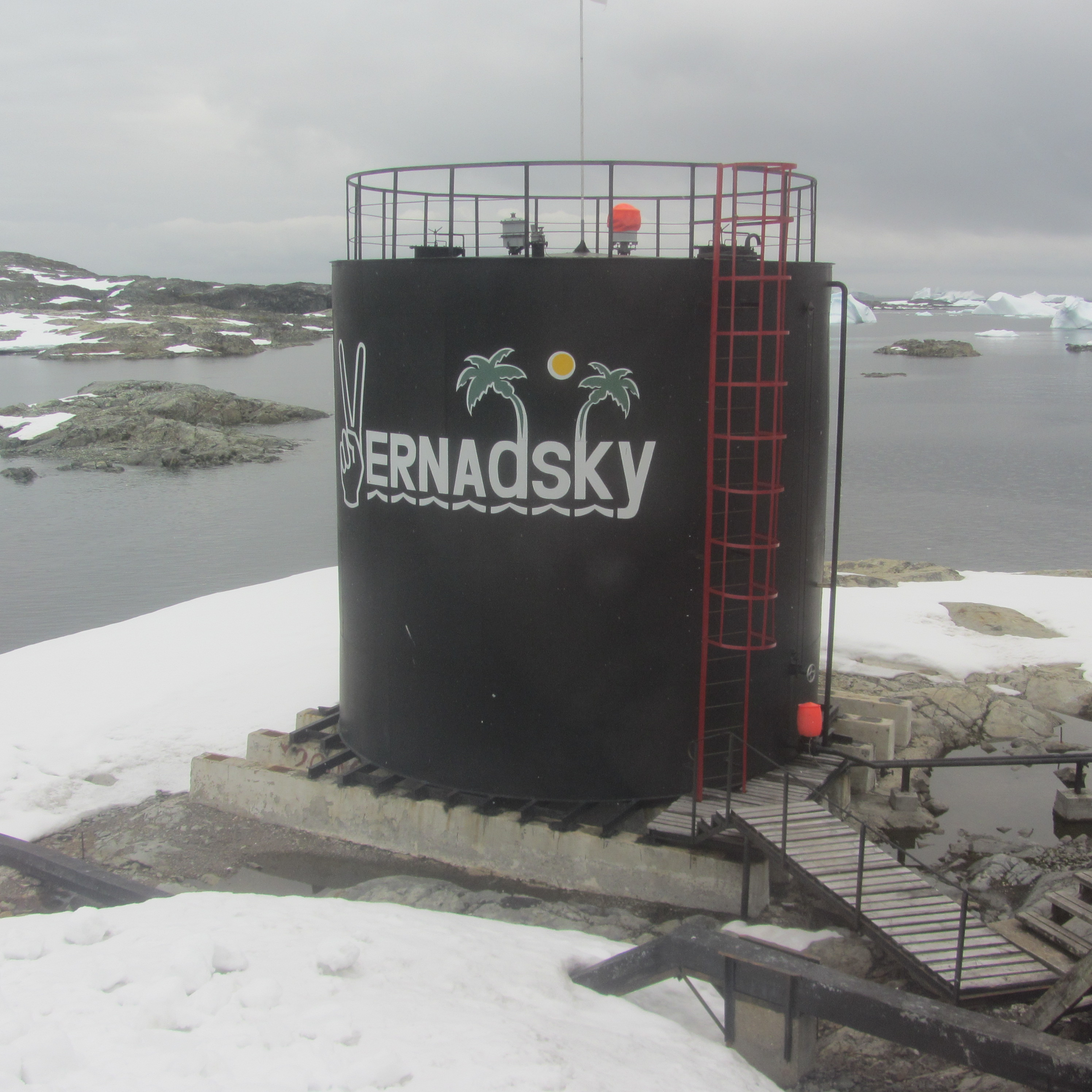
Fuel tank at Vernadsky Station

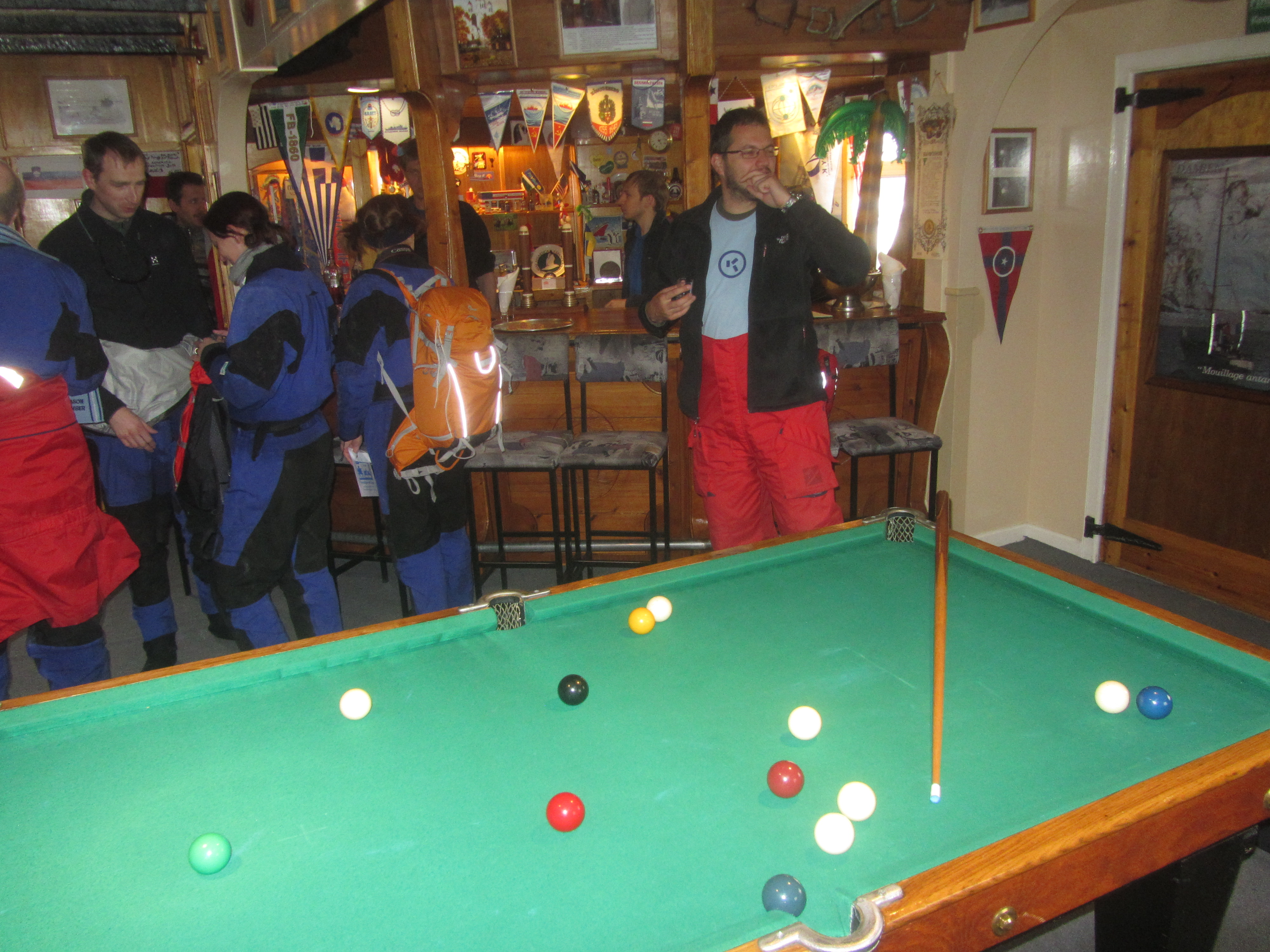
Faraday Bar inside Vernadsky Station

== See also ==
- List of Antarctic research stations
- List of Antarctic field camps
- Crime in Antarctica
- Brown Station
- Mount Tranchant
- Noosfera (icebreaker)
