= Chaigneau Peak =

Chaigneau Peak (65°13′S 64°1′W) is a sharp peak, 760 metres (2,500 ft) high, standing immediately southeast of Blanchard Ridge on the west coast of Graham Land. It was probably first sighted by the Belgian Antarctic Expedition of 1897–1899. It was charted by the French Antarctic Expedition, 1908–1910, under Jean-Baptiste Charcot, who named it for Chaigneau, then Governor of Provincia de Magallanes, Chile.
