= Mount Shackleton =

Mountain in Graham Land, Antarctica

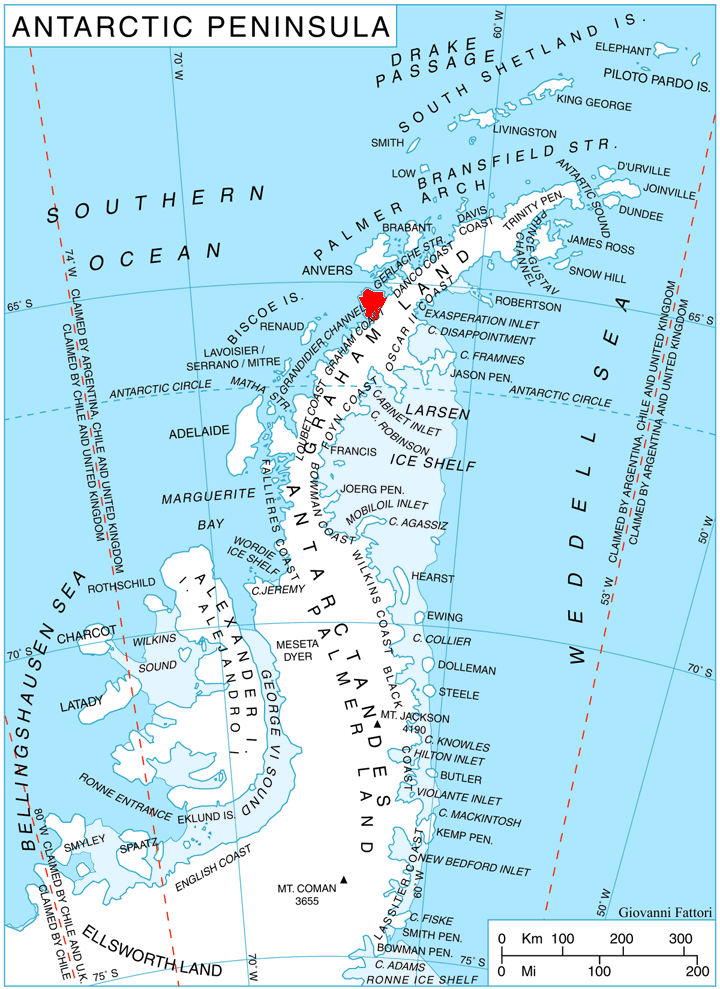
Location of Kyiv Peninsula in Graham Land, Antarctic Peninsula.

Mount Shackleton (65°13′S 63°56′W) is a mountain, 1,465 m, with perpendicular cliffs facing west, standing 2.5 miles (4.0 km) east of Chaigneau Peak between Leay and Wiggins Glaciers on Kyiv Peninsula, the west side of Graham Land in Antarctica. It was discovered by the 1908–10 French Antarctic Expedition under Charcot and named by him for Sir Ernest Shackleton.
