= The Barchans =

Island group in Wilhelm Archipelago, Antarctica

- Location within Antarctica

Geography
- Location: Antarctica
- Coordinates: 65°14′S 64°20′W
- Archipelago: Wilhelm Archipelago

Administration
- Administered under the Antarctic Treaty System

Demographics
- Population: Uninhabited

The Barchans is a group of small snow-capped islands marking the west end of the Argentine Islands, in the Wilhelm Archipelago. Charted by the British Graham Land Expedition (BGLE), by Rymill between 1934 and 1937. It was so named by him because the snow caps resemble barchans (also barkhans), migrating, crescent-shaped sand dunes found in several very dry regions of the world.
