= Galindez Island =

Antarctic island

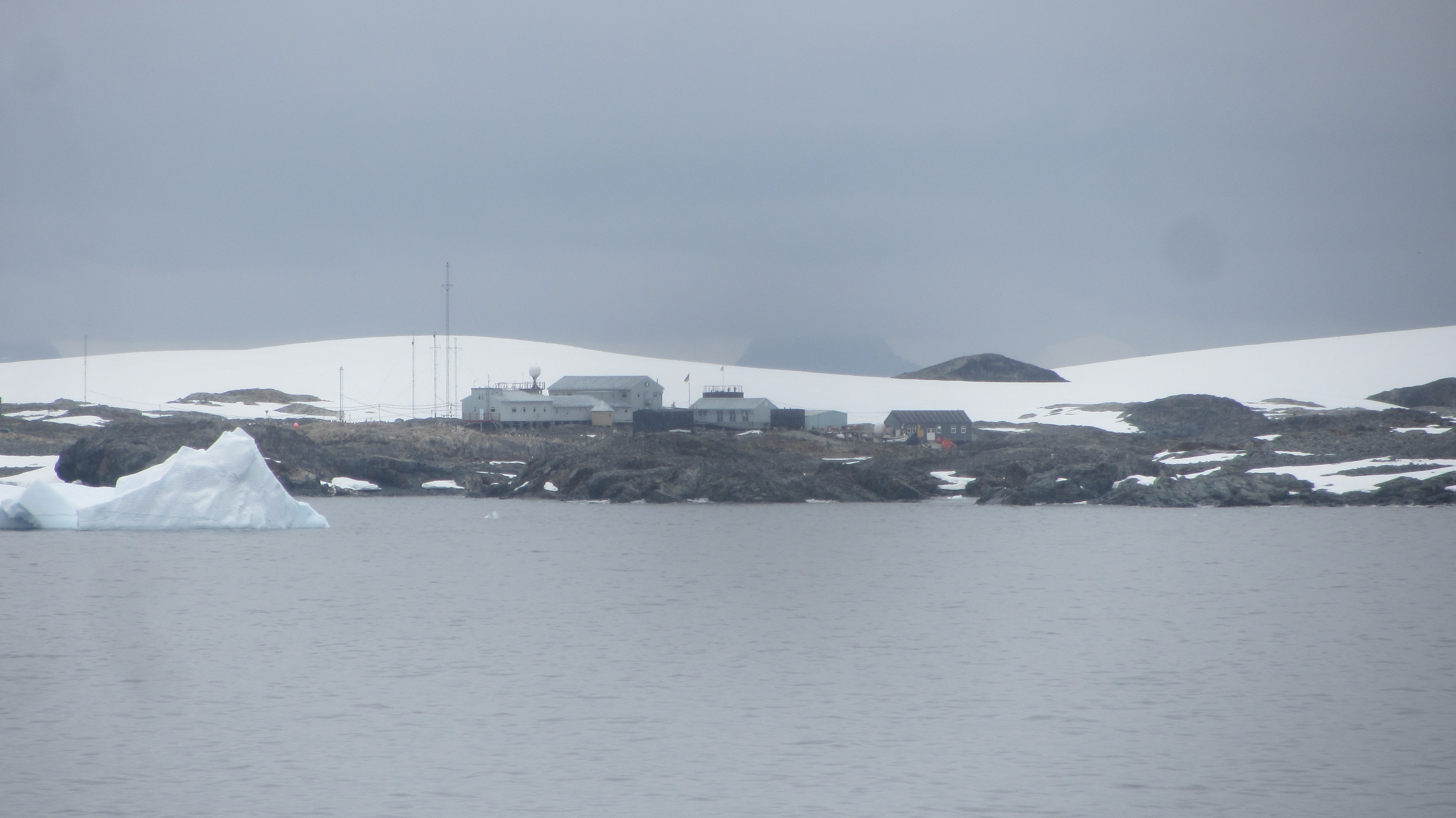
- Galindez Island, Antarctica

- Location within Antarctica

Geography
- Location: Antarctica
- Coordinates: 65°15′S 64°15′W
- Archipelago: Wilhelm Archipelago

Administration
- Administered under the Antarctic Treaty System

Galindez Island (65°15′S 64°15′W) is an island 0.5 nautical miles (0.93 km; 0.58 mi) long, lying immediately east of Winter Island in the Argentine Islands, Wilhelm Archipelago, Antarctica. It is home to the Vernadsky Research Base.

== Location ==
Graham Coast, Antarctic Peninsula. Argentine Islands near the east end

The Argentine Islands are off the Graham Coast of the Antarctic Peninsula. They are south of the French Passage, west of Mount Shackleton on the mainland, north of the Berthelot Islands and Grandidier Channel and east of the Betbeder Islands.

== Sailing directions ==
The US Defense Mapping Agency's Sailing Directions for Antarctica (1976) describes Galindez Island and its surroundings as follows:

South-southwestward of the northern group [of the Argentine Islands], and separated from it by Meek Channel, is a group of islands, the northeastern of which is named Galindez Island, and the southwestern, Skua Island. Winter Island almost fills the bight formed between the western side of the former island and the northern side of the latter island. An observation spot and a disused hut are located on the southeastern extremity of Winter Island.

There is a British base on the peninsula that forms the northwestern end of Galindez Island; Marina Point Is the north-westernmost extremity of Galindez Island. It was reported (1957) that water is obtainable during the summer months from a large pond located on the northern extremity of Galindez Island. Anchorage can be taken in a position about 200 yards northward of the point, where ringbolts ashore permit the securing of the stern.

Meek Channel has a least depth of 26 feet in the fairway and appears to be clear of dangers except for Corner Rock, which lies in the eastern entrance shout 100 yards northeastward of the northeastern extremity of Galindez Island, and a reef, with 7 feet over It, which extends about 50 yards northward from the north-western part of Galindez Island.

Westward of the northwestern part of Galindez Island, and northward of the northern side of Winter Island, is an area of foul ground on which there are a number of islets. Channel Rock, one foot high, lies at the north-eastern extremity of this foul ground, about 200 yards northwestward of the northwestern extremity of Galindez Island; Thumb Islet (Thumb Rock) lies at its southeastern end; Indicator Island lies on its southwestern part; and two islets, named The Buttons, lie on its northern part. Between this foul ground and the northwestern part of Galindez Island is a narrow channel, with a least depth of 28 feet, and between the foul ground and the northern side of Winter Island is a deep channel clear of dangers. Thcse two channels lead to Stella Creek, which separates Galindez Island and Winter Island.

... A vessel proceeding to Stella Creek from eastward by way of Meek Channel should keep close to the southern side of the western Corner Island in order to avoid Corner Rock and thence keep in mid-channel until she is near Channel Rock. Thence she should steer for Thumb Rock (Thumb Islet), passing close eastward of Channel Rock in order to avoid the reef extending northward from the northwestern part of Galindez Island. When near Thumb Rock she should steer to pass midway between this island and the northwestern part of Galinder Island. The vessel should be conned from aloft. Under favorable conditions it is possible to see the bottom in depths up to 6 fathoms. A vessel anehoring off the northern extremity of Galindez Island can secure her stern to ringbolts ashore.

== Discovery and name ==
Galindez Island was discovered by the French Antarctic Expedition, 1903–05 (FrAE), under Jean-Baptiste Charcot, who named it for Commander Ismael Galindez of the Argentine Navy, who was dispatched in the Uruguay to search for Charcot, when the expedition was feared lost early in 1905. The island was recharted by the British Graham Land Expedition (BGLE) under John Rymill, 1934–37.

== Vernadsky Research Base ==
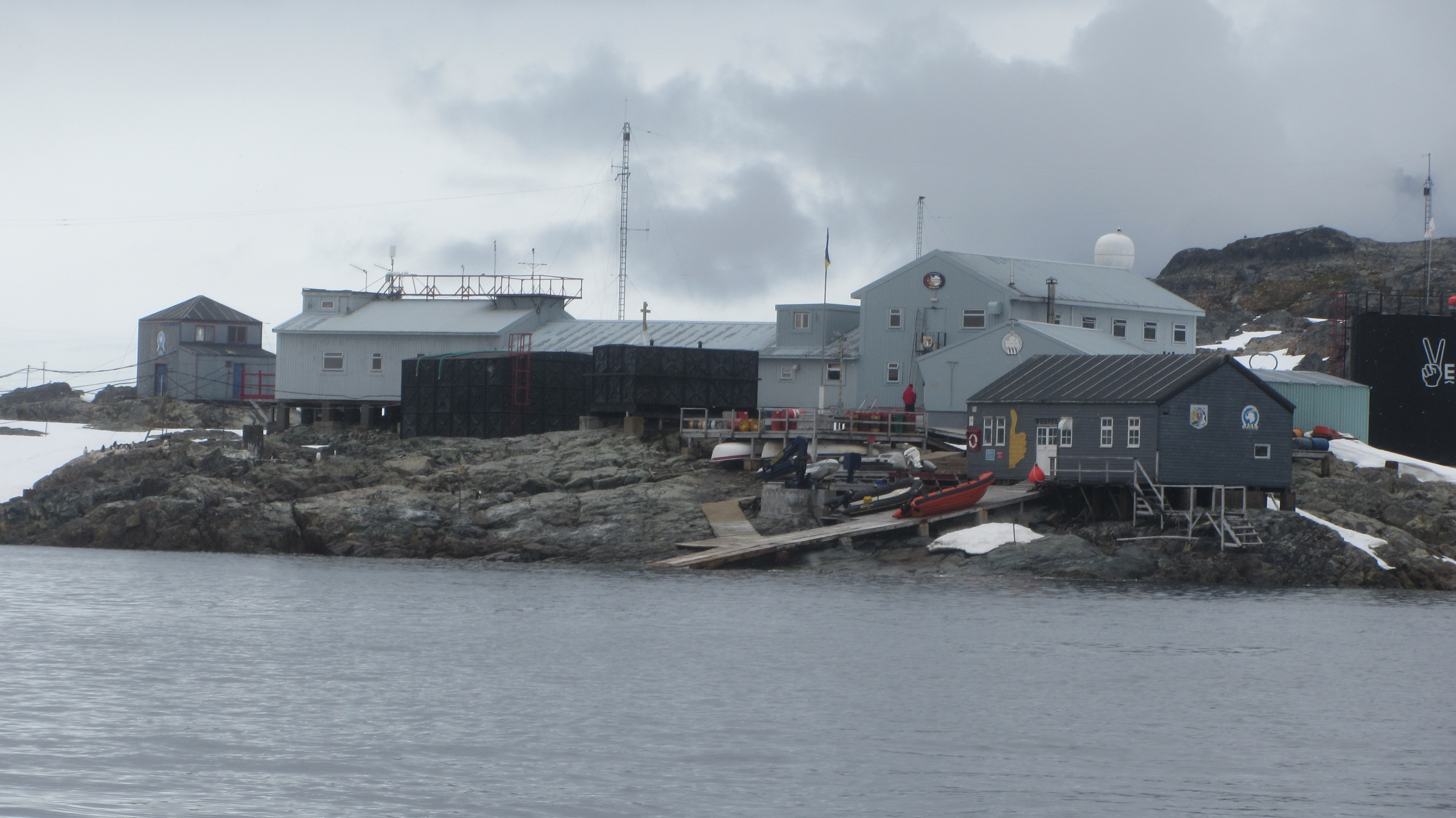
Vernadsky Station on Galindez Island in January 2014

The BGLE hut on Winter Island disappeared in mysterious circumstances (possibly due to a tsunami) in 1946. A new hut was set up on 7 January 1947 by the Falkland Islands Dependencies Survey (FIDS), becoming known officially as Station F ("Wordie Hut", after James Wordie). This was replaced on 30 May 1954 by a larger hut on nearby Galindez Island ("Coronation Hut" after the coronation of Queen Elizabeth II in 1953) and was a key observatory during the International Geophysical Year 1957/58. FIDS was re-organised and renamed as the British Antarctic Survey (BAS) in the early 1960s. After 30-odd years of continuous occupation as a geophysical, magnetic, ionospheric, atmospheric and meteorological observatory, Station F was rebuilt by BAS in 1980, before being abandoned and handed over to Ukraine on 6 February 1996 and renamed Vernadsky Research Base. The Ukrainian Vernadsky Research Base is at Marina Point on Galindez Island. St. Volodymyr Chapel is a small Ukrainian Orthodox Chapel which serves the Vernadsky Research Base.

== Features ==
=== Marina Point ===
65°15′S 64°16′W. A low rocky point which forms the northwest tip of Galindez Island. First surveyed in 1935-36 by the BGLE under Rymill and named by members of the expedition for Princess Marina, later Duchess of Kent, who was married in November 1934, while the ship Penola was enroute to the Argentine Islands.

=== Woozle Hill ===
65°15′S 64°15′W. A hill near the center of Galindez Island. First charted by the BGLE under Rymill, 1934-37. Named by the UK Antarctic Place-Names Committee (UK-APC) in 1959 after an imaginary animal in A. A. Milne's Winnie-the-Pooh which leaves tracks in the snow, in reality made by the tracker who is unaware that he is walking in circles. The hill was extensively used for ice observations and, as it can be approached from any direction, encircling tracks were often seen from the summit.

== Nearby features ==
Nearby features, from north to south, include:

=== Grotto Island ===
65°14′S 64°15′W. A narrow island 0.5 nautical miles (0.93 km; 0.58 mi) long with a serrated coastline, lying 0.1 nautical miles (0.19 km; 0.12 mi) north of Galindez Island. Charted and named in 1935 by the BGLE under Rymill.

=== Bloor Passage ===
65°14′S 64°15′W A passage leading northward from Meek Channel between Corner Island and Uruguay Island. Named by the UK-APC in 1959 for Able Seaman Vincent T. Bloor, Royal Navy, a member of the British Naval Hydrographic Survey Unit in the area in 1957-58.

=== Corner Island ===
65°15′S 64°14′W. A small island in the form of a crude right angle, lying 0.1 nautical miles (0.19 km; 0.12 mi) northeast of Galindez Island. Charted and named in 1935 by the BGLE under John Rymill.

=== Meek Channel ===
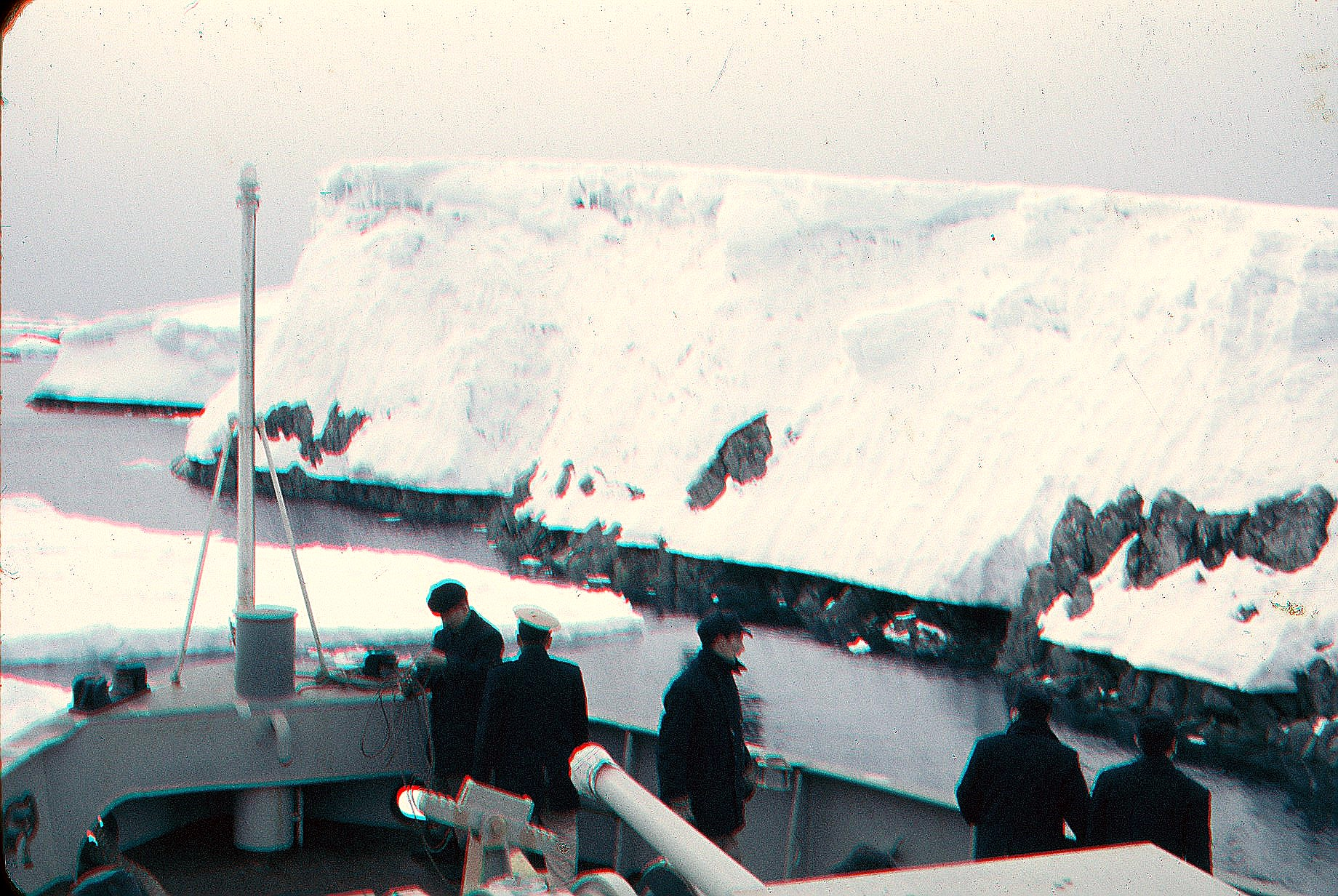
Navigating Meek Channel, 1958.

65°15′S 64°15′W. A narrow channel separating Galindez Island from Grotto Island and Corner Island. Charted in 1935 by the BGLE under Rymill, and named for William McC. Meek, marine architect and surveyor, who was of assistance in preparing the expedition ship Penola for the voyage.

=== Three Little Pigs ===
65°14′S 64°17′W. Three small islands 0.3 nautical miles (0.56 km; 0.35 mi) northwest of Winter Island. Charted and named in 1935 by the BGLE under Rymill.

=== The Buttons ===
65°14′S 64°16′W. Two small islands lying 0.2 nautical miles (0.37 km; 0.23 mi) northwest of Galindez Island. Charted and named in 1935 by the BGLE under Rymill.

=== Indicator Island ===
65°15′S 64°16′W. An island 0.1 nautical miles (0.19 km; 0.12 mi) long, lying 0.1 nautical miles (0.19 km; 0.12 mi) west of the northwest end of Galindez Island. Charted and named in 1935 by the BGLE under Rymill. A wind sock was erected on this island by the BGLE to indicate wind direction for the expedition's airplane.

=== Corner Rock ===
65°15′S 64°14′W. A rock lying about midway between Galindez Island and Corner Island at the southeast entrance to Meek Channel. Charted and named in 1935 by the BGLE under John Rymill.

=== Thumb Rock ===
65°15′S 64°16′W. A rock lying between Winter Island and the northwest end of Galindez Island. Charted and named in 1935 by the BGLE under Rymill.

=== Stella Creek ===
65°15′S 64°16′W. A narrow winding passage extending from Thumb Rock to the southeast end of Winter Island and lying between Winter Island and Galindez Island. Charted in 1935 by the BGLE and named after the expedition motor boat Stella Polaris.

=== Cornice Channel ===
65°15′S 64°15′W. A narrow channel separating Galindez Island from the east part of Skua Island. First surveyed in 1935-36 by the BGLE under Rymill. So named in 1954 by the UK-APC because a prominent cornice overhangs the ice cliff on the Galindez Island side of the channel.

== Sources ==
- Alberts, Fred G., ed. (1995), Geographic Names of the Antarctic (PDF) (2 ed.), United States Board on Geographic Names This article incorporates public domain material from websites or documents of the United States Board on Geographic Names.
- Graham Land and South Shetland Islands, BAS: British Antarctic Survey, 2005
- Sailing Directions for Antarctica: Includes Islands South of Latitude 60.̊, United States. Defense Mapping Agency. Hydrographic Center, 1976 This article incorporates public domain material from websites or documents of the National Geospatial-Intelligence Agency.
