= Lemaire Channel =

Strait in Antarctica

Coordinates: 65.133°S 64.000°W

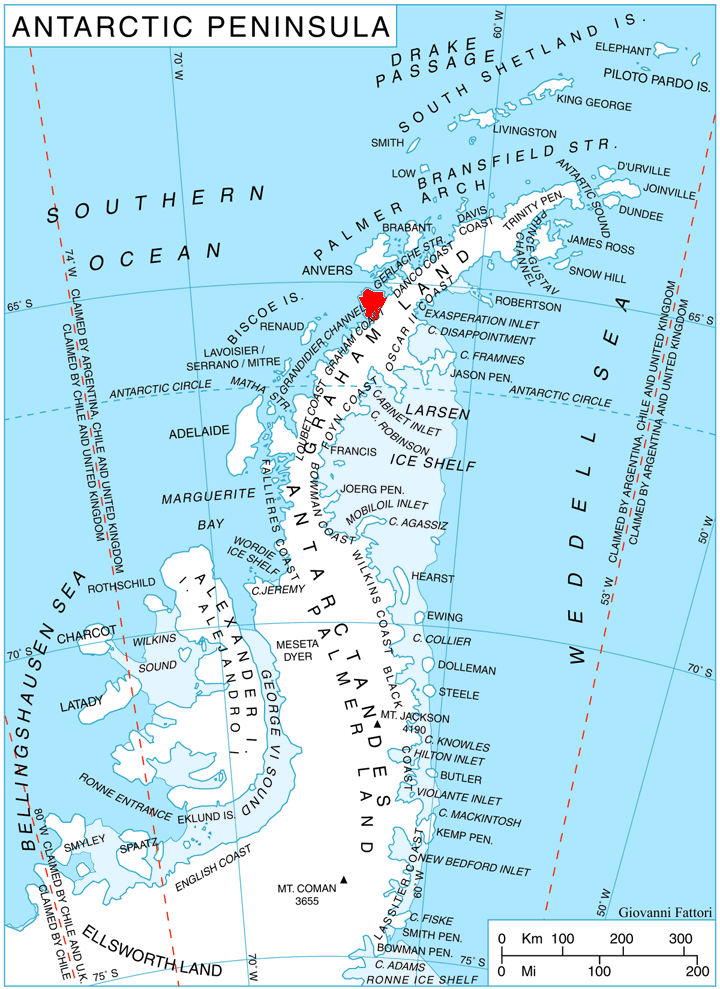
Location of Kyiv Peninsula in Graham Land, Antarctic Peninsula

Lemaire Channel is a strait off Antarctica, between Kyiv Peninsula in the mainland's Graham Land and Booth Island. Nicknamed "Kodak Gap" by some, it is one of the top tourist destinations in Antarctica; steep cliffs hem in the iceberg-filled passage, which is 11 km (6.8 mi) long and just 600 metres (2,000 ft) wide at its narrowest point.

It was first seen by the German expedition of 1873-74, but not traversed until December 1898, when the Belgica of the Belgian Antarctic Expedition passed through. Expedition leader Adrien de Gerlache named it for Charles Lemaire (1863-1925), a Belgian explorer of the Congo.

The channel has since become a standard part of the itinerary for cruising in Antarctica; not only is it scenic, but the protected waters are usually as still as a lake, a rare occurrence in the storm-wracked southern seas, and the north-south traverse delivers vessels close to Petermann Island for landings. The principal difficulty is that icebergs may fill the channel, especially in early season, obliging a ship to backtrack and go around the outside of Booth Island to reach Petermann.

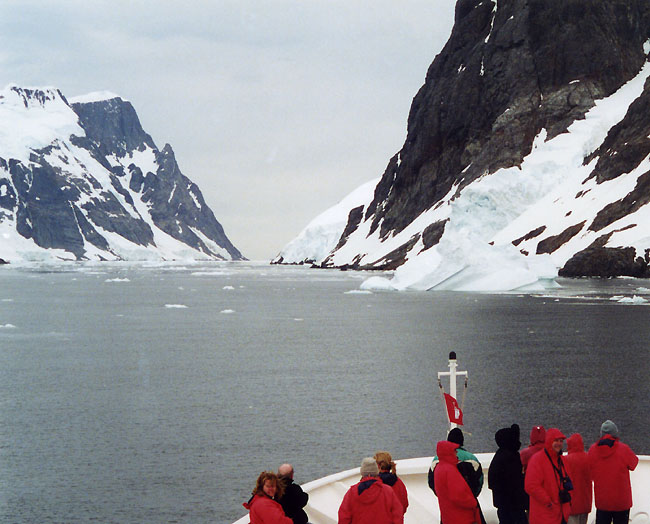
In the north entry of Lemaire Channel looking south, from the deck of the Hanseatic

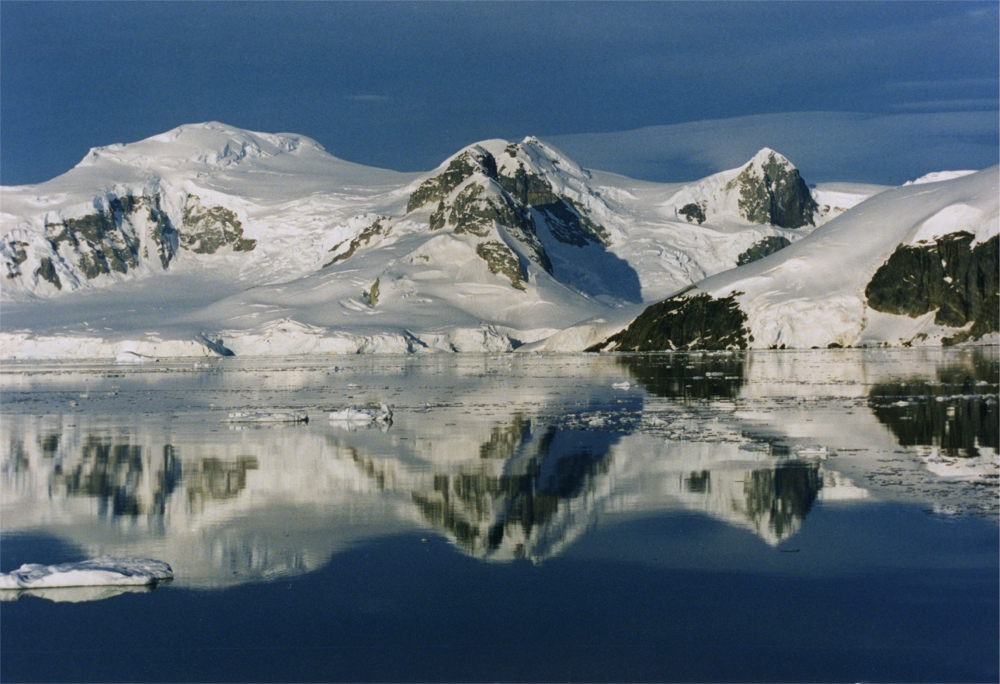
Glaciers and cliffs reflected in still waters at the south end of the channel

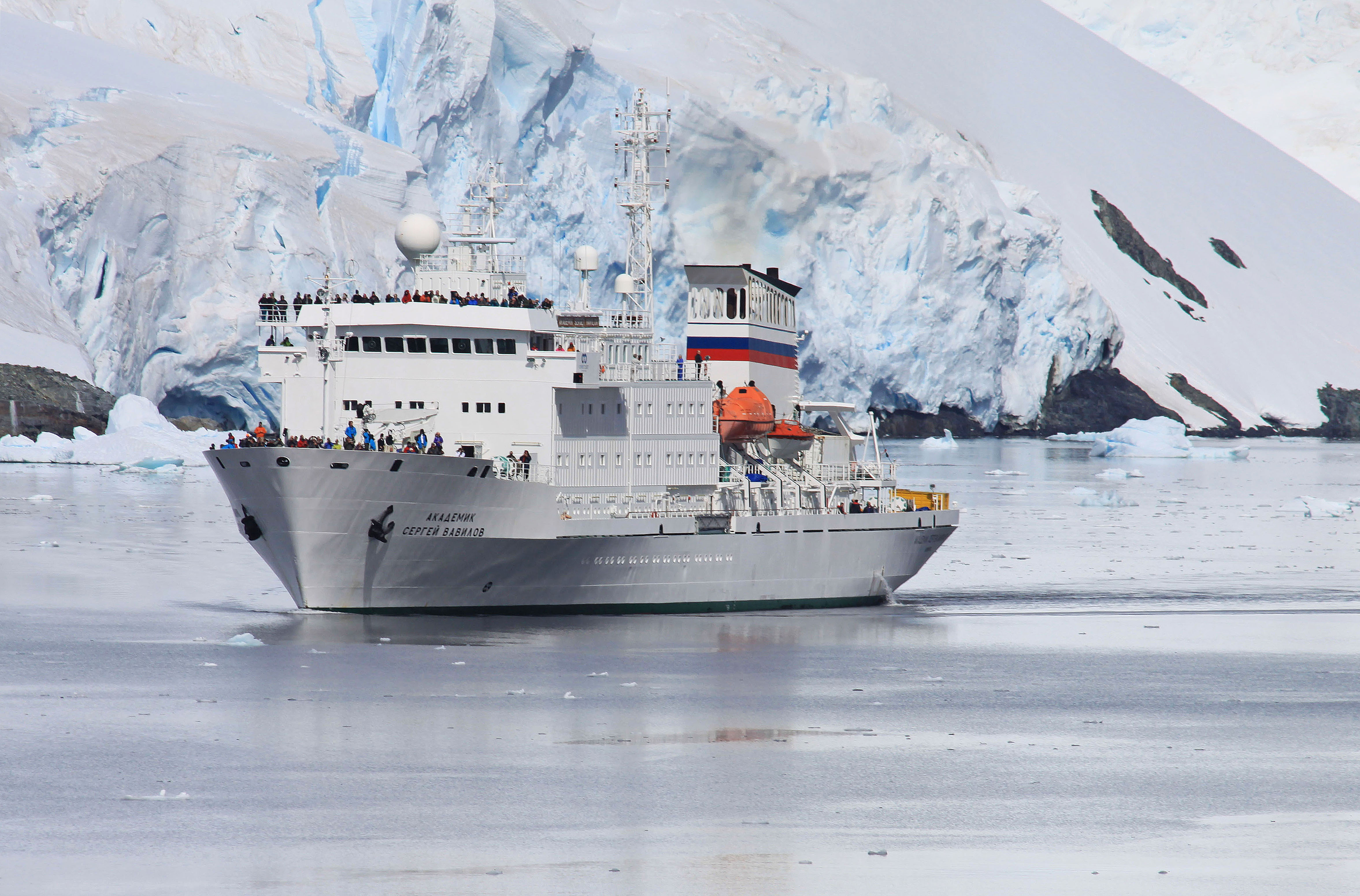
Russian cruise ship Akademik Sergey Vavilov in the Lemaire Channel

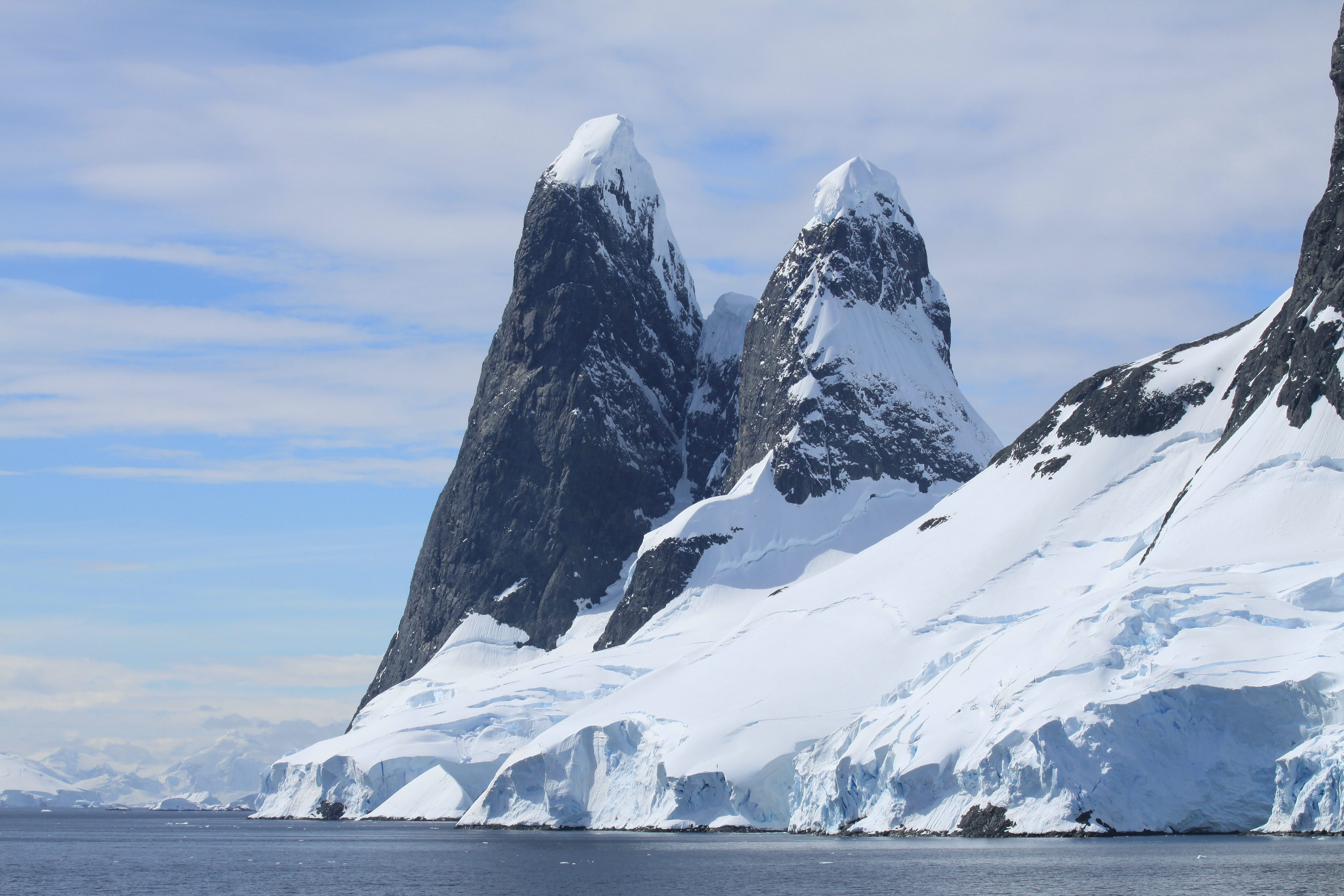
Una Peaks

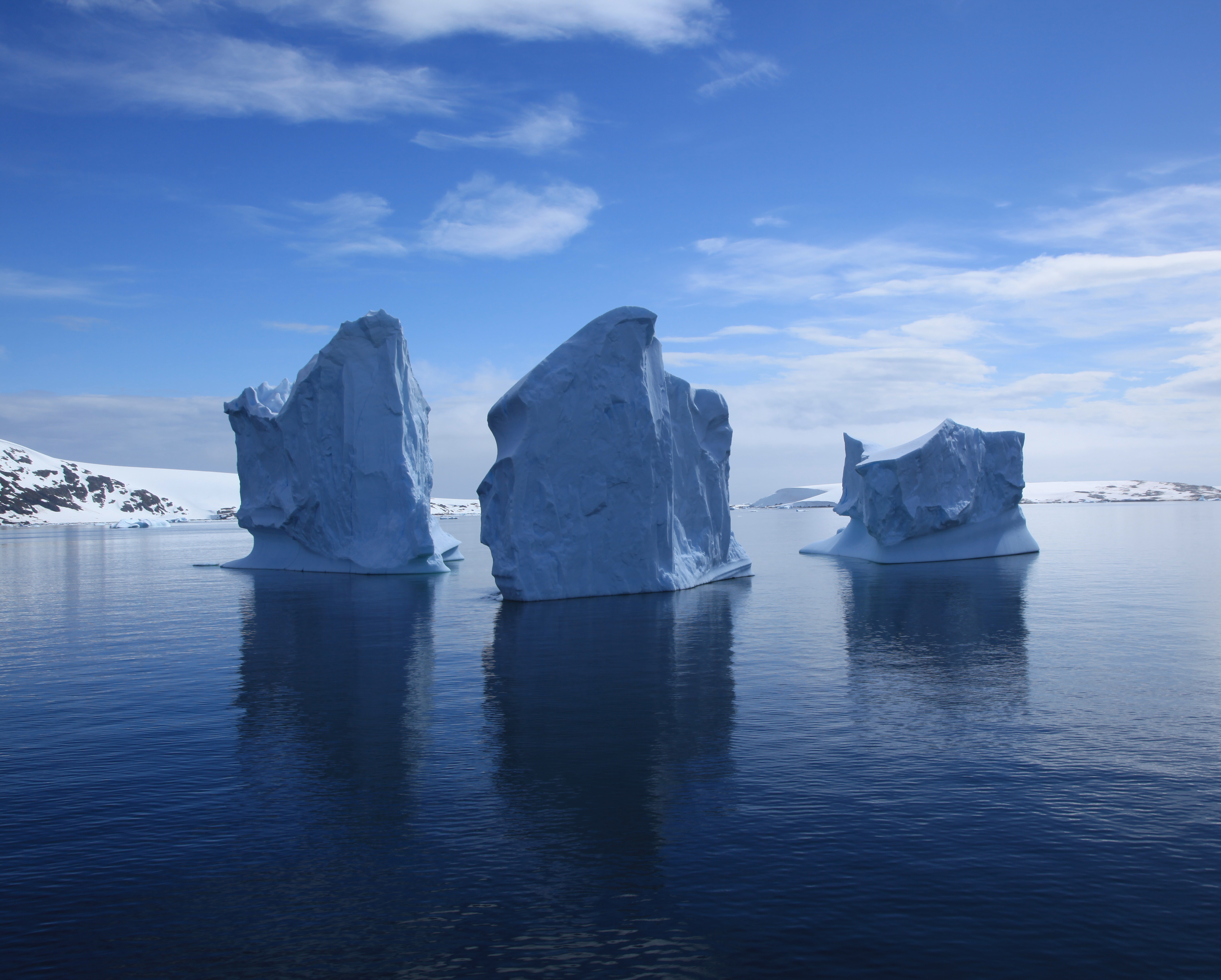
Icebergs in the channel

== Features ==
Features of the southeast coast of the channel include, from north to south, False Cape Renard, Humphries Heights, Loubat Point, Deloncle Bay, Hotine Glacier, Glandaz Point, Una Peaks, Mount Cloos, Cape Cloos, Leay Glacier, Mount Scott (Antarctica), Duseberg Buttress.

== See also ==
- Nimrod Passage
- Una Peaks
