= Hotine Glacier =

Glacier in Graham Land, Antarctica

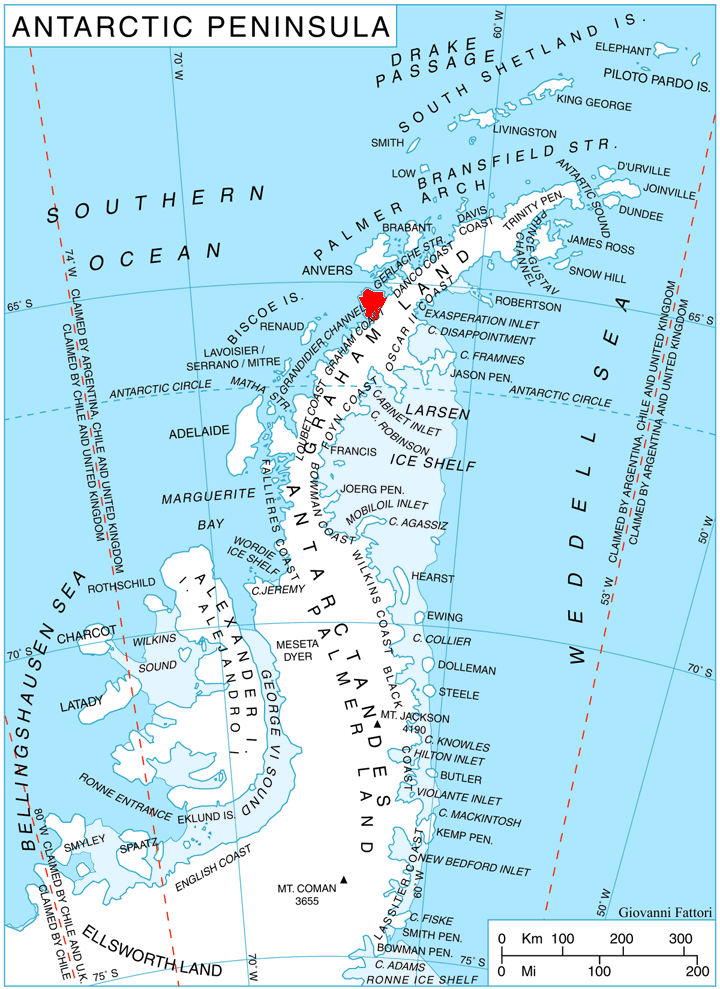
Location of Kyiv Peninsula in Graham Land, Antarctic Peninsula.

Hotine Glacier (65°8′S 63°52′W) is a glacier 10 nautical miles (19 km) long which is divided at its mouth by Mount Cloos, flowing west into both Deloncle Bay and Girard Bay on Kyiv Peninsula, on the west coast of Graham Land, Antarctica. It was first charted by the Belgian Antarctic Expedition under Gerlache, 1897–99, and was named by the UK Antarctic Place-Names Committee in 1959 for Brigadier Martin Hotine, Director of Overseas Surveys.

== See also ==
- Mount Matin, surmounts the mountainous divide north of Hotine Glacier
