= Humphries Heights =

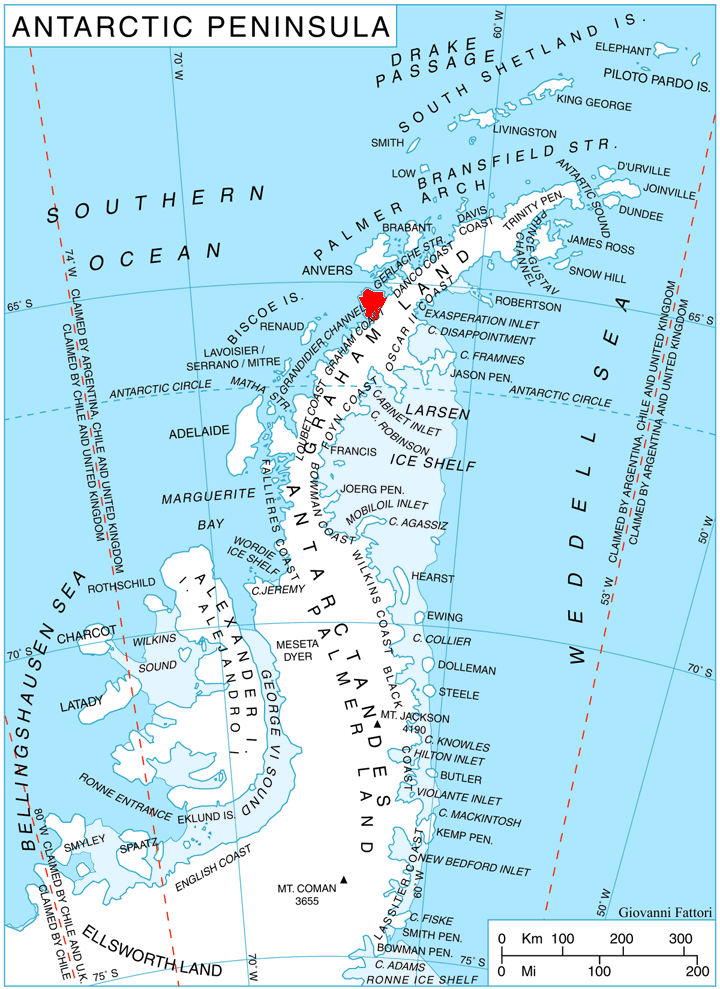
Location of Kyiv Peninsula in Graham Land, Antarctic Peninsula.

The Humphries Heights (65°3′S 63°52′W) are a series of elevations extending southwest from False Cape Renard to Deloncle Bay, on the northwest coast of Kyiv Peninsula, Graham Land, Antarctica. They were charted by the Belgian Antarctic Expedition under Gerlache, 1897–99, and were named by the UK Antarctic Place-Names Committee in 1959 for Colonel G.J. Humphries, then Deputy Director, and future Director of Overseas Surveys.
