= Nozal Hill =

Landmark

Nozal Hill is an ice-covered hill probably over 610 metres (2,000 ft), standing 1 nautical mile (1.9 km; 1.2 mi) north of Mount Shackleton and midway between Regnard Peaks and Blanchard Ridge on the west coast of Graham Land. Discovered by the French Antarctic Expedition, 1908–10, under Charcot, who named it for Monsieur Nozal, seaman, and later lieutenant on the ship Pourquoi-Pas?.
