= Demaria =

Demaria may refer to:

- Demaria (surname), surname
- Mount Demaria, mountain on the west coast of Kyiv Peninsula in Graham Land, Antarctica

== See also ==
- De Maria
