= Leay Glacier =

Glacier in Antarctica

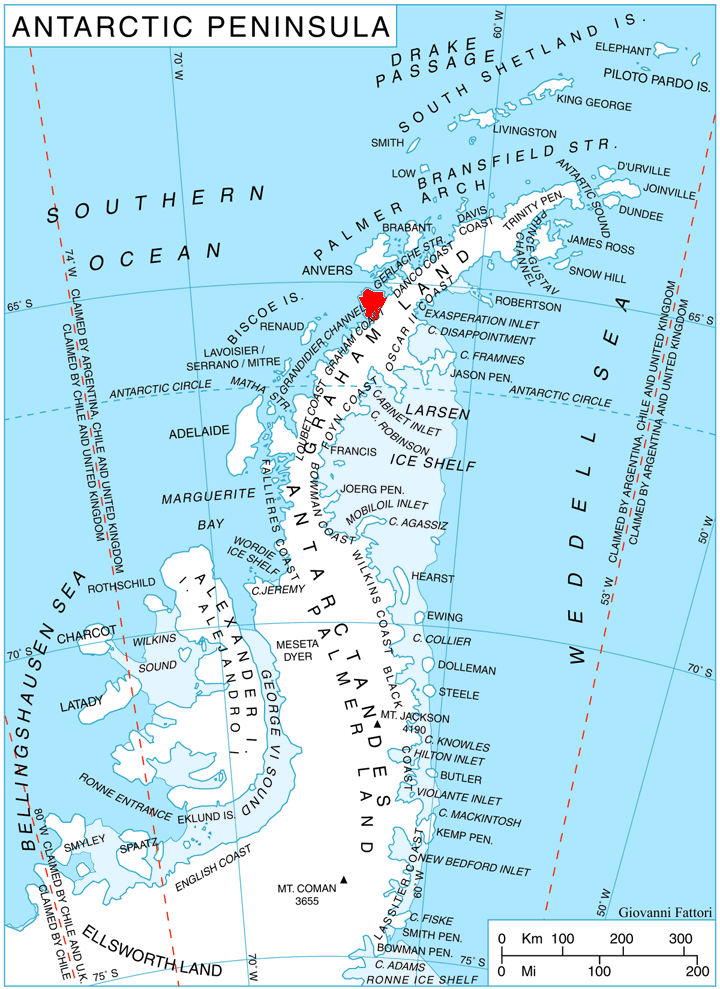
Location of Kyiv Peninsula in Graham Land, Antarctic Peninsula.

Leay Glacier (65°10′S 63°57′W) is a glacier flowing northwest into Girard Bay to the west of Hotine Glacier, on Kyiv Peninsula, on the west coast of Graham Land, Antarctica. It was first charted by the French Antarctic Expedition, 1908–10, under Jean-Baptiste Charcot, and was named by the UK Antarctic Place-Names Committee for Petra Searle (nee Leay) of the Directorate of Overseas Surveys, who has contributed to the work of mapping the Antarctic Peninsula area.
