= Demaria (surname) =

Demaria, Demaría, DeMaría, or DeMaria is a surname. Notable people with the surname include:

- Anthony J. DeMaria (1931–2025), American optical physicist and laser researcher
- Attilio Demaría (1909–1990), Italian Argentine footballer
- Chris Demaria (born 1980), American baseball player
- David DeMaría (born 1976), Spanish singer and songwriter
- Félix Demaría (born 1912), Argentine professional footballer
- Fernando Demaría (born 1928), Argentine poet, philosopher and classical scholar
- Michael DeMaria (born 1962) American psychologist, author, and musician
- Peter DeMaria (born 1960), American architect
- Tatiana DeMaria (born ?), British songwriter, singer, multi-instrumentalist, record producer, and entrepreneur
- Vincenzo DeMaria (born 1954), Italian-Canadian businessman and alleged mobster
- Yves Demaria (born 1972), French former professional motocross racer

== See also ==
- Demaria (disambiguation)
- De Maria
