= Wiggins Glacier =

Glacier in Graham Land, Antarctica

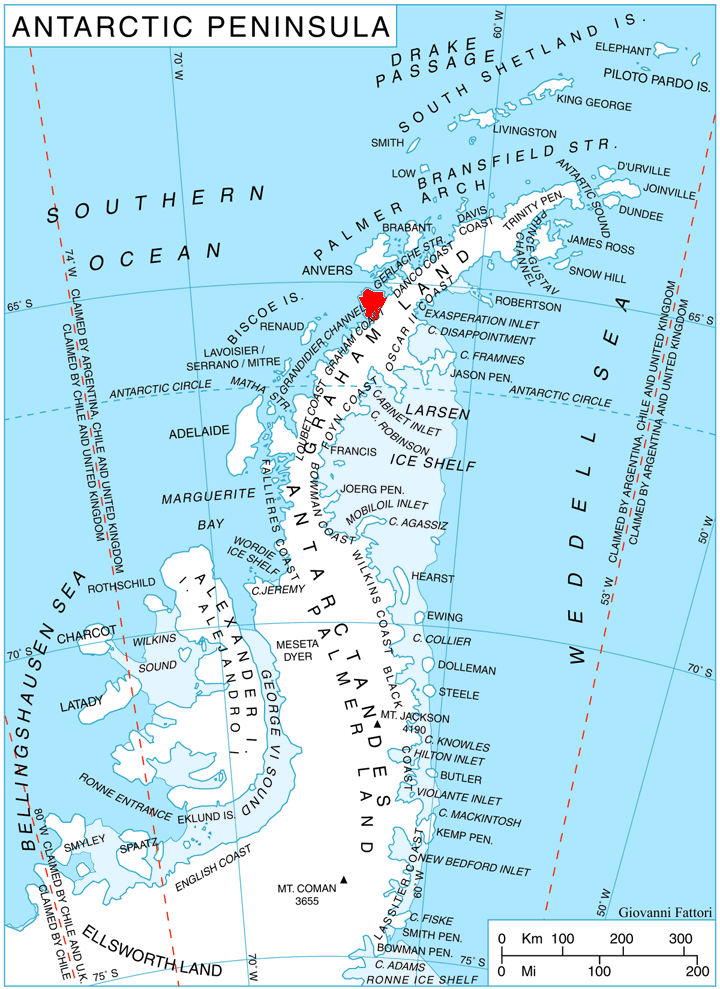
Location of Kyiv Peninsula in Graham Land, Antarctic Peninsula.

Wiggins Glacier (65°14′S 64°3′W) is a 10 nautical miles (18 km) long glacier on Kyiv Peninsula in Antarctica, flowing from Bruce Plateau to the west coast of Graham Land just south of Blanchard Ridge. Charted by the French Antarctic Expedition, 1908–10, under Charcot, and named Glacier du Milieu ("Middle Glacier"). Feeling that a more distinctive name was needed, the United Kingdom Antarctic Place-Names Committee (UK-APC) in 1959 renamed the glacier for W.D.C. Wiggins, then Deputy Director of Overseas Surveys.

== See also ==
- Mount Tranchant
