= Deloncle =

Deloncle is a French surname. It may refer to:

== People ==
- Eugène Deloncle (1890–1944), French engineer and Fascist leader
- François Deloncle (1856–1922), French orientalist, journalist and politician

== Other ==
- Deloncle Bay, bay in Graham Land, Antarctica, named after François Deloncle
