= Mount Scott (Antarctica) =

Mountain in Graham Land, Antarctica

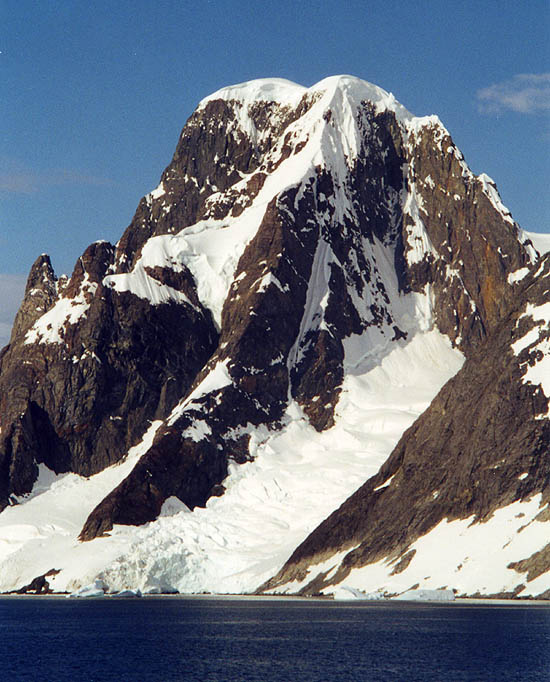
- Mount Scott, February 2001

Highest point
- Elevation: 880 m (2,890 ft)
- Prominence: 880 m (2,890 ft)
- Coordinates: 65°09′S 064°03′W

Geography
- Location: Graham Land, Antarctica

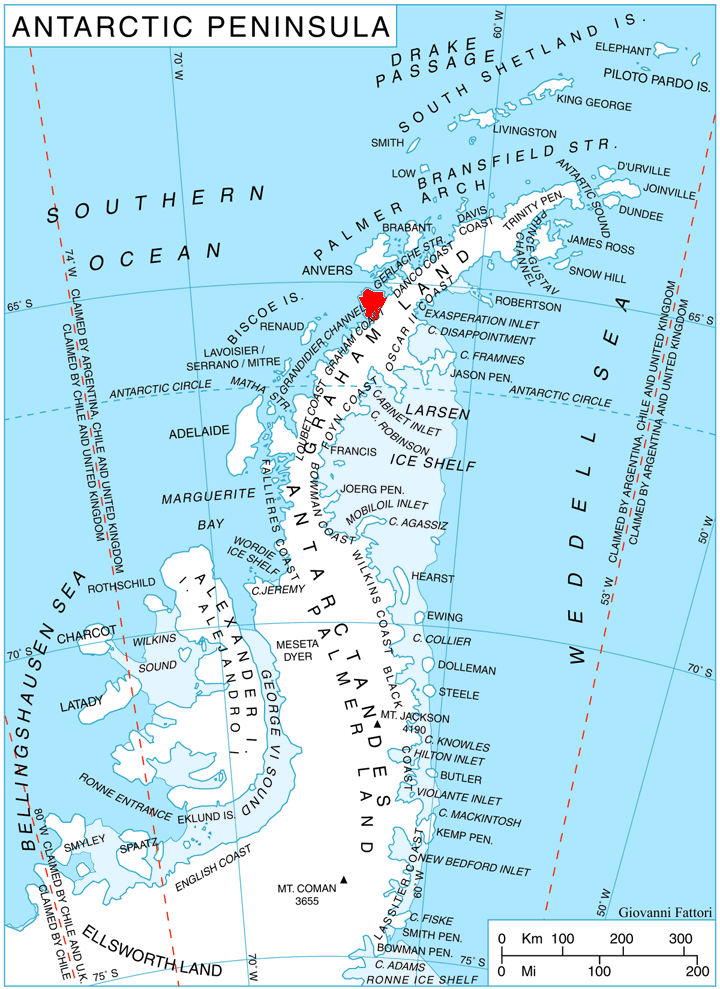
Location of Kyiv Peninsula in Graham Land, Antarctic Peninsula

Mount Scott is a horseshoe-shaped massif on Kyiv Peninsula, the west coast of Graham Land, which is open to the southwest with its convex side fronting on Girard Bay and its northwestern side on Lemaire Channel.

Discovered by the Belgian Antarctic Expedition, 1897–99. Mapped by Dr. Jean-Baptiste Charcot, leader of the fourth French Antarctic Expedition, 1908–10, and named for Royal Navy Captain Robert Falcon Scott.

Duseberg Buttress stands at the southwest side of Mount Scott.
