= Mount Cloos =

Mountain

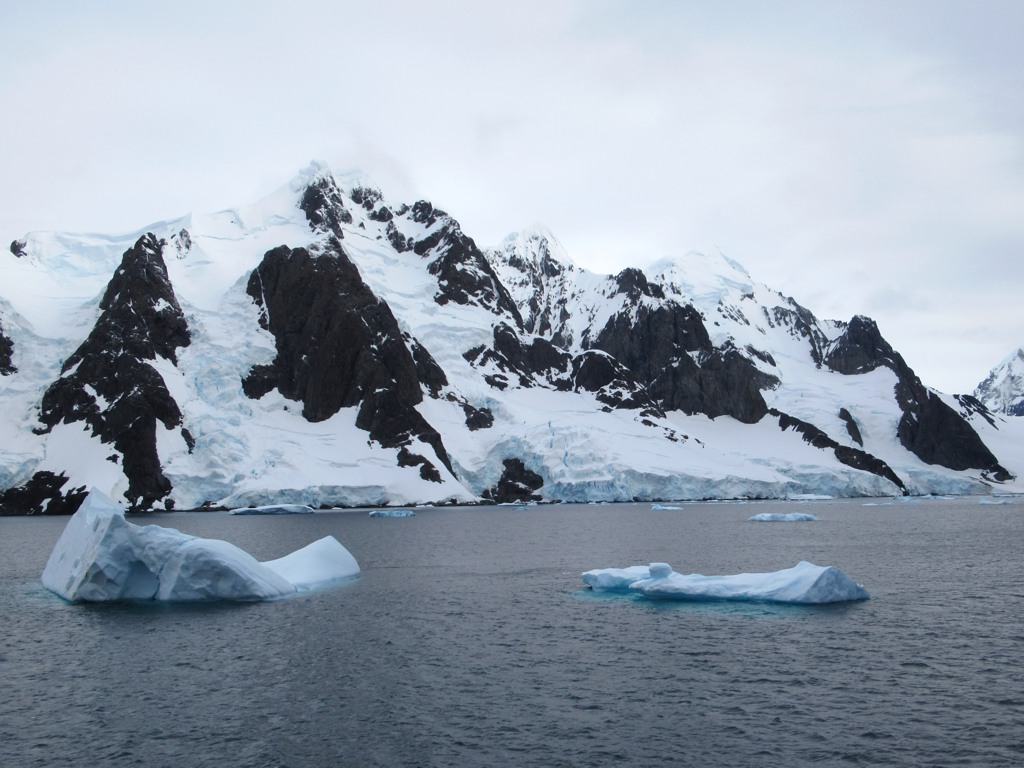
Mount Cloos

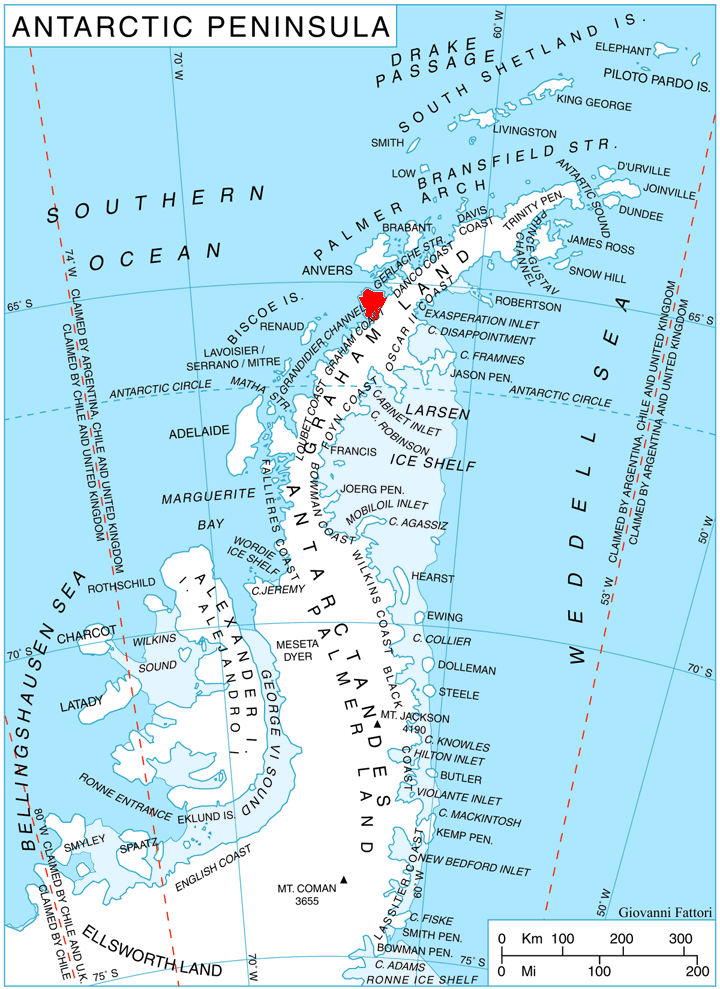
Location of Kyiv Peninsula in Graham Land, Antarctic Peninsula.

Mount Cloos (65°7′S 63°57′W) is a dome-shaped mountain probably over 915 metres (3,000 ft) high, standing at the north side of Girard Bay and 2.3 miles (3.7 km) northeast of Cape Cloos, on the northwest coast of Kyiv Peninsula in Graham Land. It was discovered by the Belgian Antarctic Expedition of 1897–99 under Gerlache. It was named in association with Cape Cloos by the French Antarctic Expedition of 1908–10 under Jean-Baptiste Charcot.
