= Flandres Bay =

Bay in Antarctica

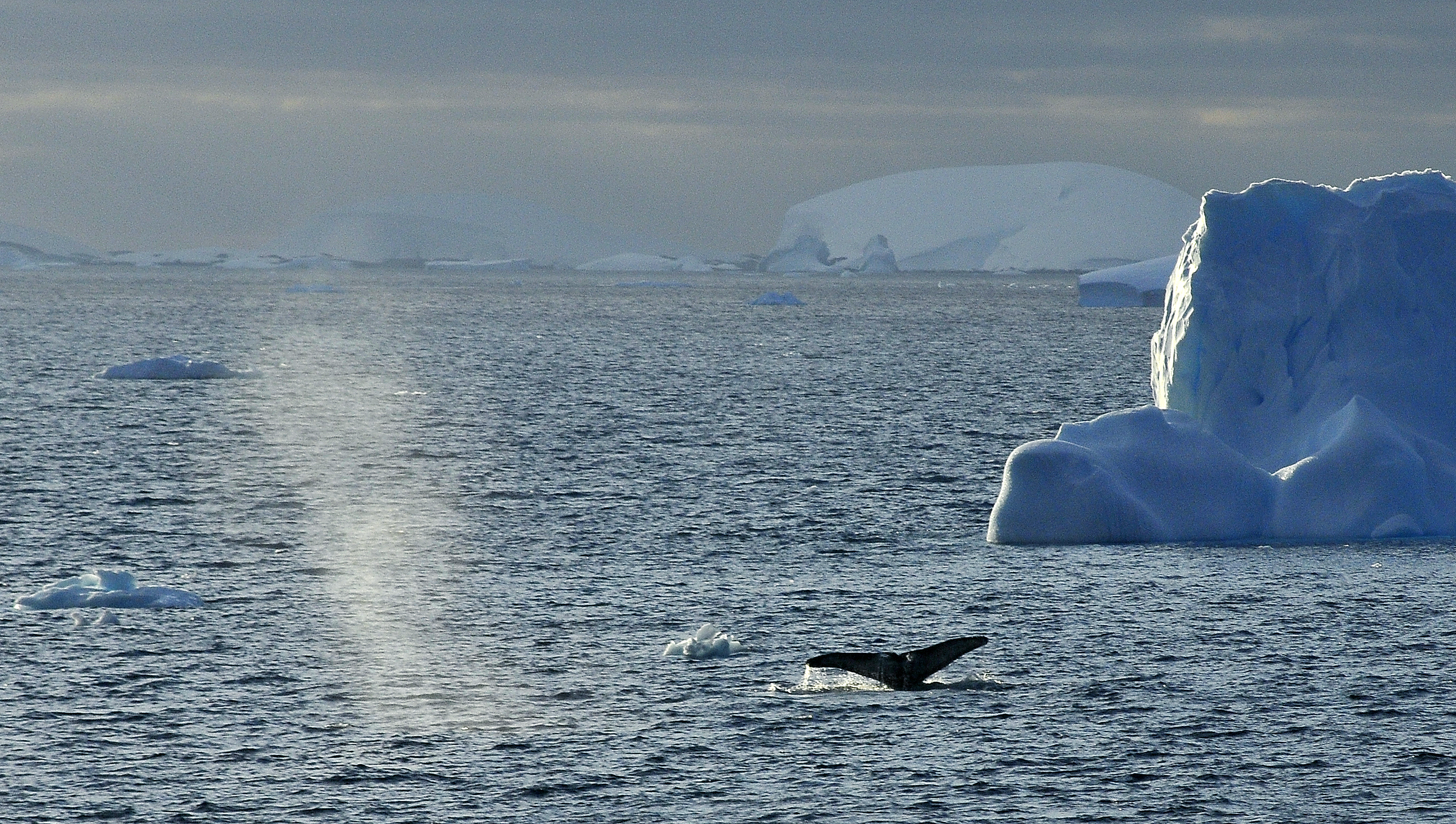
- Icebergs and a humpback whale in Flandres Bay

- Location in Antarctica
- Location: Danco Coast, Graham Land, Antarctic Peninsula
- Coordinates: 65°2′S 63°20′W

Flandres Bay (65°2′S 63°20′W) is a large bay lying between Cape Renard and Cape Willems, along the west coast of Graham Land, Antarctica.

== Location ==
Danco Coast, Antarctic Peninsula. Flandres Bay to the west

Flandres Bay is at the west end of the Danco Coast on the west side of the Antarctic Peninsula. It is southwest of Kershaw Peaks, Bryde Island and Paradise Harbour, northeast of the south end of Forbidden Plateau and the north end of Bruce Plateau, east of Booth Island and the Wauwermans Islands and south of Wiencke Island, which separates Bismarck Strait to the west from Gerlache Strait to the east. The Talbot Glacier and Niepce Glacier feed the bay from the south.

== Sailing directions ==
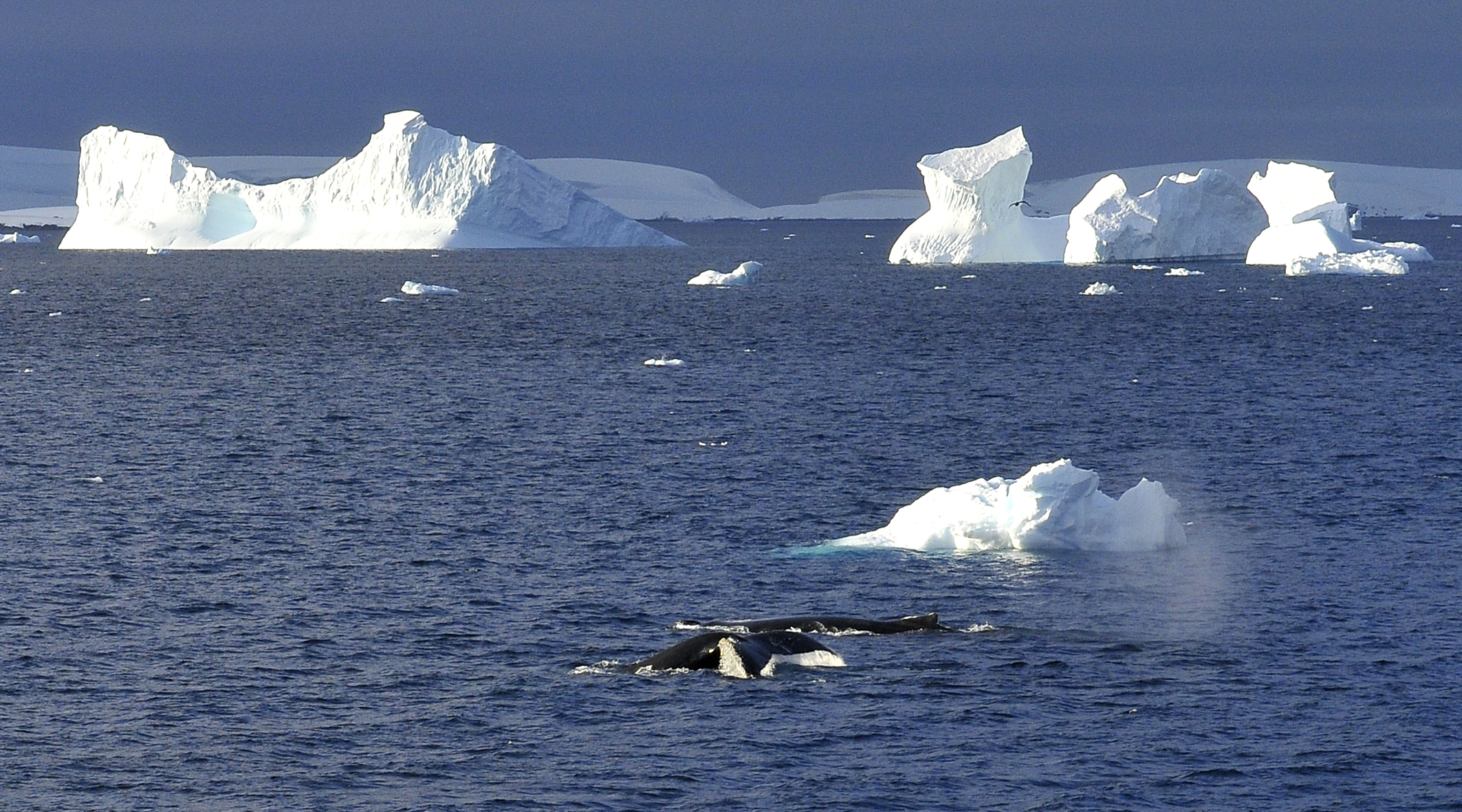
Icebergs and humpback whales in Flandres Bay

The US Defense Mapping Agency's Sailing Directions for Antarctica (1976) describes Flandres Bay as follows:

Flandres (Flanders) Bay is a large indentation at the south end of Danco Coast; it lies between Cape Willems, the northeastern entrance point, and Cape Renard. the southwestern entrance point. Between these capes, the bay is about 11 miles wide but narrows toward the head of the bay which lies southeastward about 15 miles from the entrance points. Rocks and reefs extend some distance off the shore. Moureaux Islands lie about 3 miles from the head of the bay, and the same distance east of Cape Rahir (Rahir Point), a rocky promontory of diorite, which marks the west entrance of the Inner bay. These islets are low, and snow-covered, and are connected by moraines which at times appear above the sea. Guyou Islands and a 6-fathom depth lie about 4 and 5 1/4 miles, respectively, west-northwestward of Cape Rahir. Swan Rock, 8 feet high, lies in the northeastern entrance of Flandres Bay in a position about 1 3/4 miles south-southwestward of Cape Willems.

Inland from Flandres Bay is a series of fiord valleys which radiate like fingers of a hand, each filled by a large glacier. These glaciers descend from the lofty summits of the dissected interior plateau in an easy gradient, merging into a broad flat base which reaches to the sea where frequent calving occurs.

The head of Flandres Bay is narrowed to a width of about 4 miles by Cape Rahir, a spur projecting northward from the southern shores of the bay. Beyond these narrows the upper bay contains several small bays. Briand Bay (Briand Fjord), the most northern, is about 2 miles long and 1 mile wide. Bayet Point is the extremity of mile-wide peninsula that separates Briand Bay from Pelletan Bay lying to the southward. The latter named bay, open to the westward, is about 2 1/2 miles long and wide, with gray diorite rocks lying close to the northern and southern entrance points. Etienne Bay (Etienne Fjord) indents the coast in the southwestern portion of the upper bay and has an entrance about 1 1/2 miles wide and is about 4 miles long. Another bay, Thomson Bay (Thomson Cove) is about 1 mile long and 1 1/2 miles wide, opens to the eastward, thus indenting the eastern side of the Cape Rahir Peninsula.

The western side of this peninsula trends southward 2 miles, forming the eastern shore of Bt. Lausanne Bay (Lausanne Cove), which Is about 2 miles wide. From the western entrance point of this bay, the southern shore of Flandres Bay trends westward about 1 1/2 miles to Sonia Point, a distinctive rocky projection. From this point the coast trends northwestward, broken by four small bays, to a point which forms the eastern entrance of Hidden Bay. Foul ground extends for a distance of about 1 1/2 miles off this point. This foul area is interspersed with many small islets and, at its outer edge, is about 3 miles long in an east-west direction. The shore then trends south-southwesterly for about 4 miles to the head of a narrow bay (Hidden Bay). Thence it extends in a northerly direction for about 3 miles to Cape Renard. The latter is a conspicuous headland, 2,330 feet high, marked by two steep needles, the slopes of which are too precipitous for snow to cover them. Behind these needle peaks Is an extensive snow cap with hanging glaciers on the slopes which terminate seaward in cliffs of ice.

== Exploration and name ==
Flandres Bay was explored in 1898 by the Belgian Antarctic Expedition (BelgAE) under Adrien de Gerlache, who named it, probably after the historical area of Flanders, now constituting part of France, Belgium and the Netherlands. .

== Glaciers ==
Glaciers include, clockwise from the east,

=== Vogel Glacier ===
65°00′S 63°10′W. A glacier flowing into Flandres Bay 3 nautical miles (5.6 km; 3.5 mi) southeast of Cape Willems. The glacier appears on an Argentine government chart of 1952. Named by the UK Antarctic Place-Names Committee (UK-APC) in 1960 for Hermann Wilhelm Vogel (1834–98), German chemist who introduced the first orthochromatic emulsion for photographic plates in 1903.

=== Bolton Glacier ===
65°01′S 62°58′W. A glacier flowing into the head of Briand Fjord, Flandres Bay. Mapped in 1959 by the Falkland Islands Dependencies Survey (FIDS) from photos taken by Hunting Aerosurveys Ltd. in 1956–57. Named by the UK-APC for William B. Bolton (1848–89), English photographer who, with B.J. Sayce, invented the collodion emulsion process of dry-plate photography in 1864.

=== Sayce Glacier ===
65°05′S 62°59′W. A glacier flowing into Flandres Bay immediately north of Pelletan Point. Charted by the BelgAE under Gerlache, 1897–99. Named by the UK-APC in 1960 for B.J. Sayce (1839–95), English photographer who, with W.B. Bolton, invented the collodion emulsion process of dryplate photography, which displaced wet collodion in 1864.

=== Goodwin Glacier ===
65°06′S 62°57′W. A glacier flowing west into Flandres Bay southward of Pelletan Point. Charted by the BelgAE under Adrien de Gerlache, 1897–99. Named by the UK-APC in 1960 for Hannibal Goodwin (1822–1900), American pastor who invented the first transparent nitrocellulose flexible photographic roll-film in 1887.

=== Carbutt Glacier ===
65°09′S 62°49′W. Glacier entering Goodwin Glacier to the east of Maddox Peak, close east of Flandres Bay. The glacier appears on an Argentine government chart of 1954. Named by the UK-APC in 1960 for John Carbutt (1832–1905), American (formerly English) photographer who introduced the first emulsioncoated celluloid photographic cut films, in 1888.

=== Archer Glacier ===
65°10′S 63°05′W. A glacier flowing northwest into the head of Bolsón Cove, Flandres Bay. First charted by the BelgAE under Gerlache, 1897–99. Named by the UK-APC in 1960 for Frederick Scott Archer (1813–57), English architect who in 1849 invented the wet collodion process of photography, the first practical process on glass.

=== Talbot Glacier ===
65°12′S 63°14′W. A glacier flowing into Etienne Fjord, Flandres Bay. First charted by the BelgAE under Gerlache, 1897–99. Named by the UK-APC in 1960 for Henry Fox Talbot (1800–77), English inventor of the first practical photographic process on paper, perfected and called calotype in 1839–41.

=== Niépce Glacier ===
65°07′S 63°22′W. A glacier which joins with Daguerre Glacier and flows into Lauzanne Cove. Shown on an Argentine government chart of 1954. Named by the UK-APC in 1960 for Nicéphore Niépce (1765–1833), French physicist, the first man to produce a permanent photographic record, 1816–29, who, with Louis Daguerre, invented the daguerreotype process of photography perfected in 1839.

=== Daguerre Glacier ===
65°07′S 63°25′W. A glacier which joins with Niépce Glacier and flows into Lauzanne Cove, Flandres Bay. Shown on an Argentine government chart of 1954. Named by the UK-APC in I960 for Louis Daguerre (1787–1851), French painter and physicist who, with Nicéphore Niépce, invented the daguerreotype process of photography perfected in 1839.

== Eastern coastal features ==
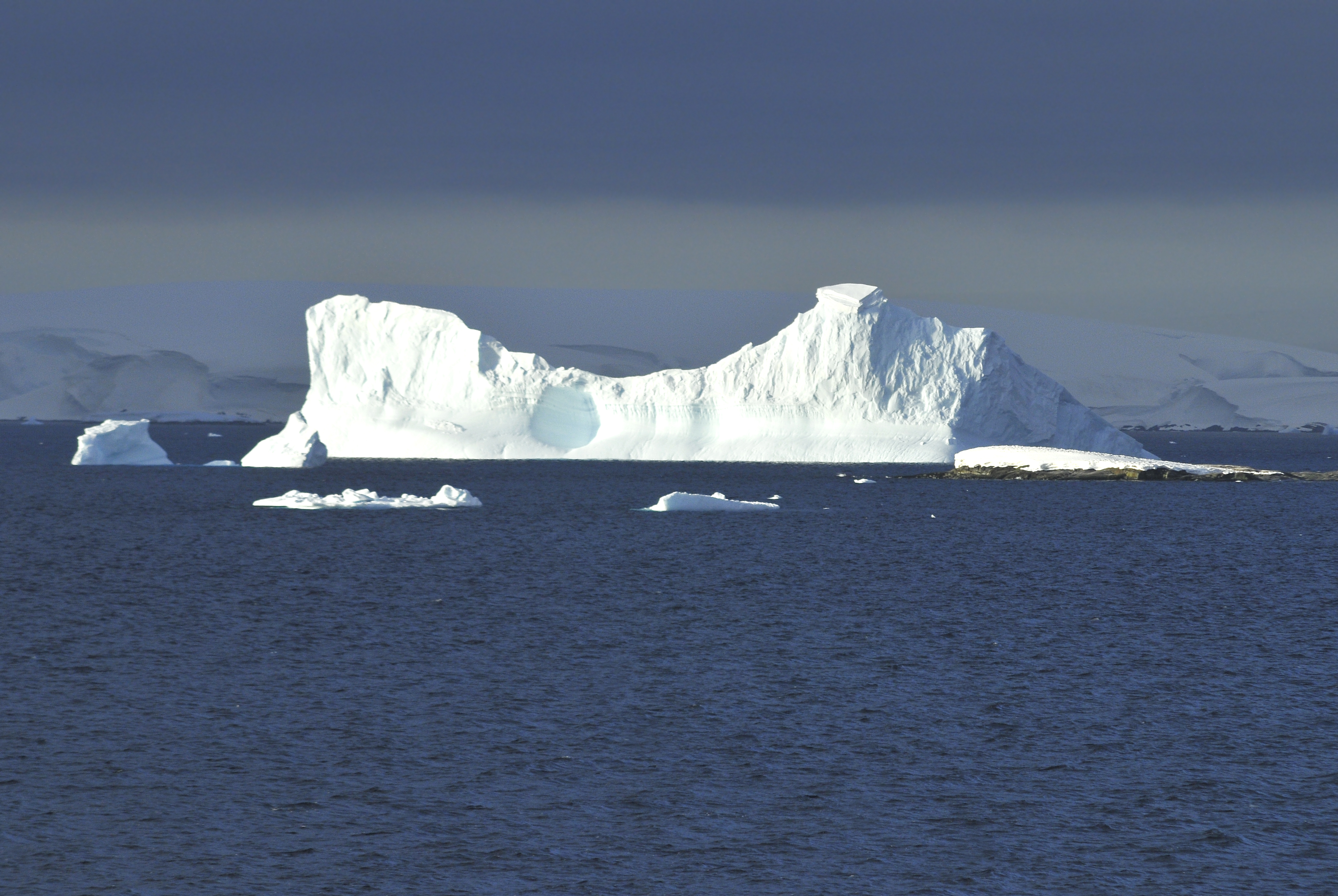
View of Flandres Bay

Coastal features, north to south, include

=== Cape Willems ===
64°57′S 63°16′W. A cape forming the north side of the entrance to Flandres Bay. First charted by the BelgAE, 1897–99, and named by Gerlache for Pierre Willems.

=== Briand Fjord ===
65°01′S 63°01′W. A bay nearly 3 nautical miles (5.6 km; 3.5 mi) long in the northeast part of Flandres Bay. Charted by the French Antarctic Expedition (FrAE; 1903–05) and named by Jean-Baptiste Charcot for Aristide Briand (1862–1932), French statesman and Minister of Public Instruction in 1906.

=== Bayet Peak ===
65°02′S 63°01′W. A conspicuous peak, 1,400 metres (4,600 ft) high, overlooking the south shore of Briand Fjord in Flandres Bay. The southeast entrance point of Briand Fjord was charted by the FrAE under Charcot, 1903–05, and named "Pointe Bayet" for Charles Bayet, Director of Instruction and member of the Commission of Scientific Work of the expedition. As air photos show no well-defined point in this position the name has been applied to this conspicuous peak.

=== Pelletan Point ===
65°06′S 63°02′W. A long, narrow point projecting into the head of Flandres Bay 3 nautical miles (5.6 km; 3.5 mi) south of Briand Fjord. Charted by the FrAE (1903–05) under Charcot, who applied the name "Baie Pelletan" to the indentations north and south of the point here described. In 1960 the UK-APC transferred the name Pelletan to the point; the two indentations do not together form an identifiable feature and they can be easily described by reference to this point. Charles-Camille Pelletan (1846–1915) was a French politician and Minister of the Navy, 1902–05.

=== Maddox Peak ===
65°09′S 62°50′W. A peak standing at the south side of the mouth of Carbutt Glacier, east of Flandres Bay. The peak appears on an Argentine government chart of 1954. Named by the UK-APC in 1960 for Richard Leach Maddox (1816–1902), English physician and pioneer of photography who invented the gelatin emulsion process of dry-plate photography in 1871, revolutionizing photographic technique.

=== Mount Eastman ===
65°10′S 62°59′W. A mountain overlooking the head of Flandres Bay, 4 nautical miles (7.4 km; 4.6 mi) south of Pelletan Point. Charted by the BelgAE under Gerlache, 1897–99. Named by the UK-APC in 1960 for George Eastman (1854–1932), American inventor, manufacturer and philanthropist who, with W.H. Walker, produced the first practicable photographic rollfilm camera (Kodak) in 1888.

=== Bolsón Cove ===
65°09′S 63°05′W. A cove at the head of Flandres Bay, lying immediately east of Étienne Fjord. First charted by the BelgAE under Gerlache, 1897–99. The name appears on an Argentine government chart of 1954 and is probably descriptive; bolsón is Spanish for a large purse.

== Western coastal features ==
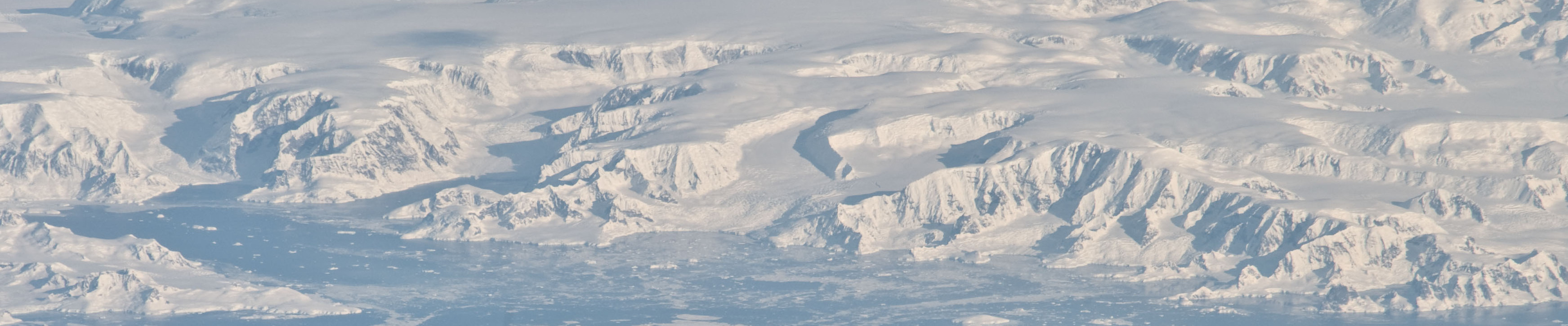
Flanders Bay with Étienne Fjord and Lauzanne Cove (bay in the middle)

Western coastal features include, from south to north:

=== Étienne Fjord ===
65°09′S 63°13′W. A bay 5 nautical miles (9.3 km; 5.8 mi) long, lying between Bolsón and Thomson Coves on the south side of Flandres Bay. Charted by the FrAE, 1903–05, and named by Charcot for Eugène Étienne (1844–1921), French politician, Vice President of the Chamber of Deputies, 1902–04, and Minister of War, 1905–06.

=== Gerber Peak ===
65°07′S 63°17′W. A peak 2 nautical miles (3.7 km; 2.3 mi) south-southwest of Rahir Point, standing close south of Thomson Cove, Flandres Bay. Charted by the BelgAE under Gerlache, 1897–99. Named by the UK-APC in 1960 for Friedrich Andreas Gerber (1797–1872), Swiss veterinary surgeon who first suggested the use of photography for book illustration, in 1839.

=== Thomson Cove ===
65°06′S 63°14′W. A cove 1 nautical mile (1.9 km; 1.2 mi) wide, lying just north of Etienne Fjord in Flandres Bay. First charted and named "Baie Thomson" by the FrAE under Charcot, 1903–05, for Gaston-Arnold-Marie Thomson (1848–1932), French politician who was Minister of the Navy in 1905.

=== Rahir Point ===
65°04′S 63°14′W. A point marking the northeast end of a small peninsula which extends into Flandres Bay just north of Thomson Cove. First charted by the BelgAE under Gerlache, 1897–99, and named "Cap Rahir," probably for Maurice Rahir, Belgian geographer and member of the Belgian Royal Geographical Society.

=== Gaudin Point ===
65°05′S 63°22′W. The eastern entrance point of Lauzanne Cove, Flandres Bay. First charted by the FrAE, 1903–05, under Charcot. In association with the names of pioneers of photography in this area, the point was named by UK-APC (1977) after Marc Antoine Auguste Gaudin (1804–80), French photographer who took the first instantaneous photographs of moving objects in 1841.

=== Lauzanne Cove ===
65°05′S 63°23′W. A cove 2 nautical miles (3.7 km; 2.3 mi) wide, lying immediately south of Guyou Islands on the south side of Flandres Bay. First charted by the FrAE, 1903–05, under Charcot, who named it for Stéphane Lauzanne, chief editor of the French newspaper Le Matin, 1900–15.

=== Reade Peak ===
65°06′S 63°29′W. A peak, 1,060 metres (3,480 ft) high, rising 1 nautical mile (1.9 km; 1.2 mi) south of Sonia Point and Flandres Bay. Mapped by the FIDS from photos taken by Hunting Aerosurveys Ltd. in 1956–57. Named by the UK-APC in 1960 for Joseph Bancroft Reade (1801–70), English pioneer of photography, who obtained photographs on paper coated with silver nitrate, developed with gallic acid and fixed with hyposulphate of soda, in 1837.

=== Sonia Point ===
65°04′S 63°29′W. A point lying 6 nautical miles (11 km; 6.9 mi) west of Rahir Point on the south side of Flandres Bay. First charted by the FrAE under Charcot, 1903–05, and named for Madame Sonia Bunau-Varilla.

=== Hyatt Cove ===
65°05′S 63°32′W. A cove at the west side of Sonia Point in Flandres Bay. Discovered and roughly mapped by the BelgAE, 1897–99. Mapped in greater detail in the 1950s by Argentine, British and Chilean expeditions. Named by the UK-APC in 1986 after Raymond H. Hyatt of the Cartographic Section, Foreign and Commonwealth Office, 1949-85 (Head, 1970–85), with responsibility for preparing UK-APC maps.

=== Haverly Peak ===
65°06′S 63°33′W. A peak rising to 960 metres (3,150 ft) high, 1 nautical mile (1.9 km; 1.2 mi) east of the head of Azure Cove, Flandres Bay. In association with the names of cartographers grouped near this area, named by the UK-APC in 1986 after William R. Haverly, of the Cartographic Section, Foreign and Commonwealth Office, from 1970, (Head from 1986), with responsibility for preparing UK-APC maps.

=== Azure Cove ===
65°04′S 63°35′W. Cove 1 nautical mile (1.9 km; 1.2 mi) long, lying just east of Cangrejo Cove in the southwest part of Flandres Bay. Discovered by the BelgAE under Gerlache (1897–99) and named "Baie d'Azur" because when the Belgica anchored near here, everything appeared to be colored blue in the evening light.

=== Cangrejo Cove ===
65°04′S 63°39′W. A cove 1.5 nautical miles (2.8 km; 1.7 mi) long lying immediately west of Azure Cove in Flandres Bay. First roughly charted by the BelgAE under Gerlache, 1897–99. The name "Bahia Cangrejo" (crayfish cove or crayfish bay) was given by the Argentine Antarctic Expedition of 1951–52. The name is descriptive and derives from the small peninsula forming the west side of the cove which, when viewed from the air, resembles the pincers of a crayfish.

=== Azufre Point ===
65°03′S 63°39′W. A point lying 3 nautical miles (5.6 km; 3.5 mi) southeast of Cape Renard on the south side of Flandres Bay. First charted by the BelgAE under Gerlache, 1897–99. Charted by the Argentine Antarctic Expedition (1954) and named Punta Azufre (sulfur point).

=== Aguda Point ===
65°02′S 63°41′W. A point forming the east side of the entrance to Hidden Bay. First charted by the BelgAE under Gerlache, 1897–99. The name appears on an Argentine government chart of 1957 and is probably descriptive; aguda is Spanish for sharp or sharp pointed.

=== Hidden Bay ===
65°02′S 63°46′W. A bay 3 nautical miles (5.6 km; 3.5 mi) long, lying between Cape Renard and Aguda Point. First charted by the BelgAE under Gerlache 1897–99. So named by the UK-APC in 1958 because from the north the bay is hidden by the Screen Islands.

== Islands ==
=== Renard Island ===
65°01′34.0″S 63°46′35″W An island approximately 1.1 nautical miles (2.0 km; 1.3 mi) long and 0.85 nautical miles (1.57 km; 0.98 mi) wide with Cape Renard at its northern end and separated from False Cape Renard by a channel that appeared following the loss of ice prior to 2001. Named by UK-APC (2008) in association with Cape Renard.

=== Cape Renard ===
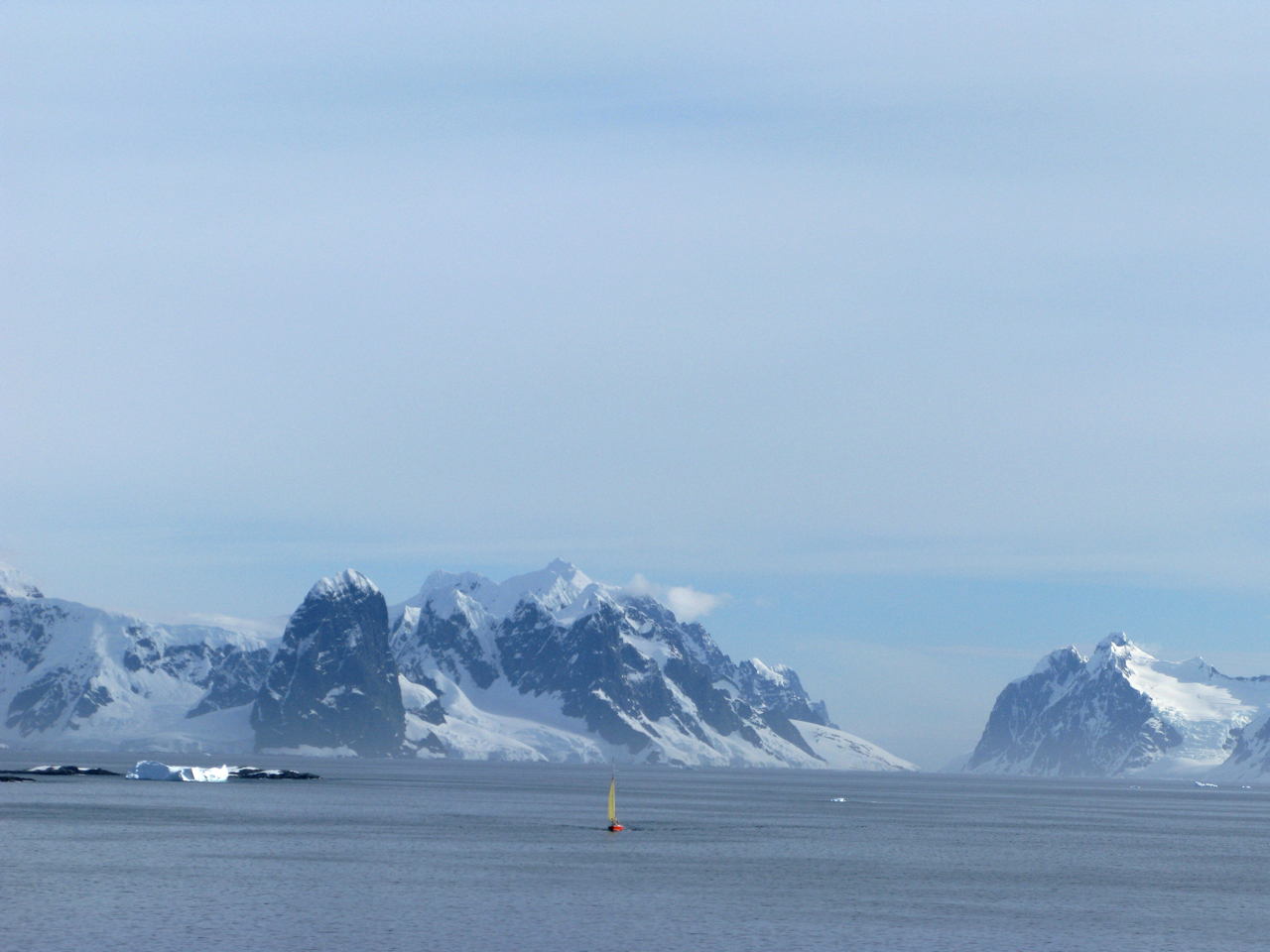
Cape Renard with Una Peaks on the left, Booth Island on the right, and between them Lemaire Channel

65°01′S 63°47′W. A cape forming the south side of the entrance to Flandres Bay and separating Danco Coast and Graham Coast on the west coast of Antarctic Peninsula. Discovered in 1898 by the BelgAE under Gerlache and named by him for Professor Alphonse Renard, a member of the Belgica Commission and of the Belgian Royal Academy.

=== Puzzle Islands ===
64°59′S 63°40′W. A group of small islands, rocks and reefs at the mouth of Flandres Bay, lying 1 nautical mile (1.9 km; 1.2 mi) west of Ménier Island. First charted by the FrAE under Charcot, 1903–05. So named by the UK-APC in 1958; the group is often hidden by icebergs which come to rest in the surrounding shallow waters.

=== Sucia Island ===
64°58′S 63°36′W. A small, almost entirely snow-covered island in Flandres Bay, lying immediately north of Ménier Island. The name Sucia (foul) appears on an Argentine government chart of 1952. The toponym reflects the characteristics of the waters surrounding the island with many low-lying dangers to navigation.

=== Ménier Island ===
64°59′S 63°37′W. , An island, the largest in a small island group lying in the mouth of Flandres Bay, 4 nautical miles (7.4 km; 4.6 mi) northeast of Cape Renard. The island group was discovered by the FrAE under Charcot, 1903–05, who gave them the name "Iles Ménier." The name Ménier is here applied to the largest of these islands.

=== Screen Islands ===
65°01′S 63°43′W. A group of islands extending northwest from Aguda Point for 1.5 nautical miles (2.8 km; 1.7 mi) across the entrance to Hidden Bay. First charted by the BelgAE under Gerlache, 1897–99. So named by the UK-APC in 1958 because they form a screen across the entrance to Hidden Bay.

=== Swan Rock ===
64°58′S 63°18′W. A low rock lying 1.5 nautical miles (2.8 km; 1.7 mi) southwest of Cape Willems. The rock appears on an Argentine government chart of 1950. Named by the UK-APC in 1960 for Sir Joseph Swan (1828–1914), English manufacturer who invented the carbon process for photographic printing in 1866 and pioneered gelatin dry plates for instantaneous photography, 1879–81.

=== Guyou Islands ===
65°03′S 63°24′W. A small group of islands lying 2 nautical miles (3.7 km; 2.3 mi) northeast of Sonia Point in Flandres Bay. First charted by the BelgAE under Gerlache (1897–99), and named for Émile Guyou (1843–1915), French mathematician who prepared a report on the magnetic results of the expedition.

=== Moureaux Islands ===
65°05′S 63°08′W. Two islands and off-lying rocks lying 2.5 nautical miles (4.6 km; 2.9 mi) west-northwest of Pelletan Point in Flandres Bay. First charted and named by members of the BelgAE under Gerlache, who made a landing on one of the islands in February 1898.

=== Ponton Island ===
65°06′S 63°05′W. A small island lying 1.5 nautical miles (2.8 km; 1.7 mi) southeast of Moureaux Islands near the head of Flandres Bay. The name "Islote Solitario" appears for the feature on an Argentine government chart of 1954, but has been rejected to avoid confusion with Solitario Island at 67°52′S 68°26′W. . The island was renamed by the UK-APC in 1960, for Mungo Ponton (1802–80), a Scottish inventor who discovered in 1839 that potassium bichromate spread on paper is light sensitive, an important landmark in the development of photography.

== Sources ==
- Alberts, Fred G., ed. (1995), Geographic Names of the Antarctic (PDF) (2 ed.), United States Board on Geographic Names This article incorporates public domain material from websites or documents of the United States Board on Geographic Names.
- Graham Land and South Shetland Islands, BAS: British Antarctic Survey, 2005
- "Renard Island", Composite Gazetteer of Antarctica, Scientific Committee on Antarctic Research
- Sailing Directions for Antarctica: Includes Islands South of Latitude 60.̊, United States. Defense Mapping Agency. Hydrographic Center, 1976 This article incorporates public domain material from websites or documents of the National Geospatial-Intelligence Agency.
