= Matin =

Matin or MATIN may refer to:

- Al-Matin, a name of God in Islam
- Morning (dawn, early day, foreday) in medieval English

== Places ==
- Mount Matin, Antarctic Peninsula, Antarctica; a mountain
- Stade du Matin, Colombes, France; a multipurpose stadium

== People ==
- Matin (surname)
- Matin Karimzadeh (born 1998), Iranian soccer player
- Matin Ahmed Khan (died 2014), Pakistani academic

== Other uses ==
- MATIN, an Austrian political party
- RTL Matin, the Matin morning programme on the RTL radio network
- Inter Matin, the Matin morning programme on the Inter radio network

== See also ==
- Le Matin (disambiguation)
- Matins (disambiguation)
- Matina (disambiguation)
- Matins, a morning prayer service
