= Matina =

Matina may refer to:

== Places ==
- Matina, Bahia, Brazil
- Matina (canton), in the Limón province of Costa Rica
  - Matina District
  - Raid on Matina, or the Battle of Matina, in 1747
- Matina (Maglaj), Bosnia and Herzegovina
- Matina, an area of Davao City, Philippines
- Matina River, in Costa Rica

== People ==
- Matina Brothers, or Matina Midget Troupe, a Hungarian-born trio of American entertainers in the early 20th century
- Matina Horner (born 1939), an American psychologist
- Matina Kolokotronis (born 1964), an American basketball executive
- Mateena Rajput, Indian actress, see Welcome to Kashmir

== Other uses ==
- Matina (record label), founded by Kisaki

== See also ==
- Matin (disambiguation)
