= Nimrod Passage =

Marine passage in the Wilhelm Archipelago, Antarctica

Nimrod Passage (64°59′S 63°58′W) is a marine passage leading to the northern end of Lemaire Channel between Wauwermans Islands and Dannebrog Islands in Wilhelm Archipelago in Antarctica. The passage was surveyed by the Royal Navy Hydrographic Survey Unit in March–April 1964, safely navigated by RRS John Biscoe, and is named after the motor survey boat Nimrod which was used to take most of the soundings.
