= Régnard Peaks =

Mountain in Antarctica

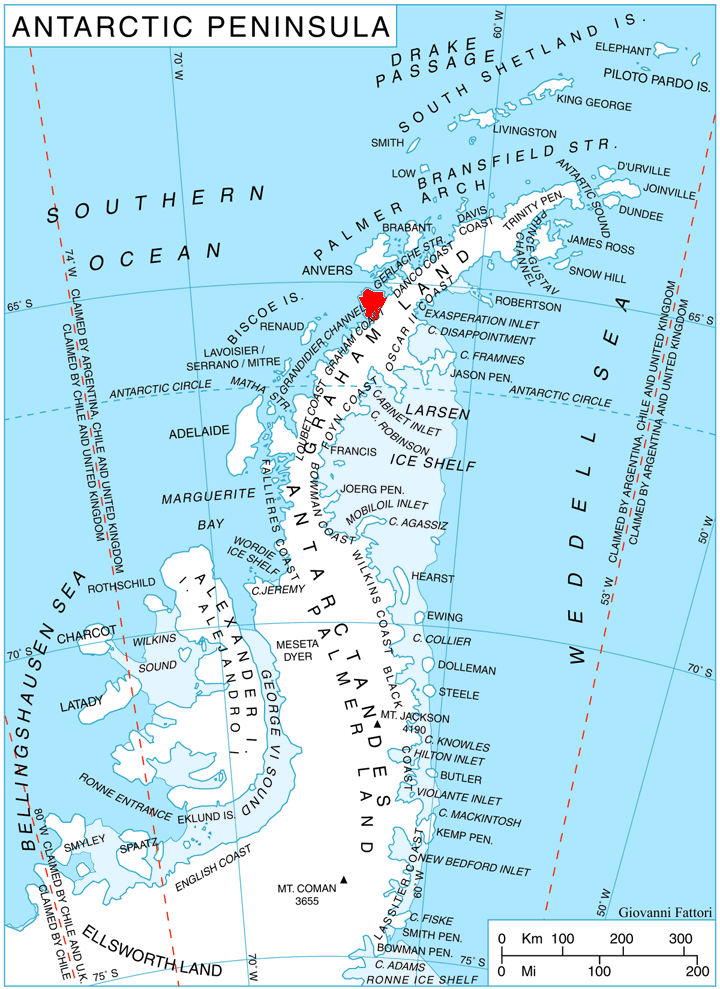
Location of Kyiv Peninsula in Graham Land, Antarctic Peninsula.

Régnard Peaks (65°11′S 63°53′W) is a group of rounded, snow-covered peaks probably over 1,220 metres (4,000 ft), standing 3 nautical miles (5.6 km) north of Mount Peary on Kyiv Peninsula, on the west coast of Graham Land. They were discovered and named by the French Antarctic Expedition under J.B. Charcot, 1908–10.
