= Glandaz Point =

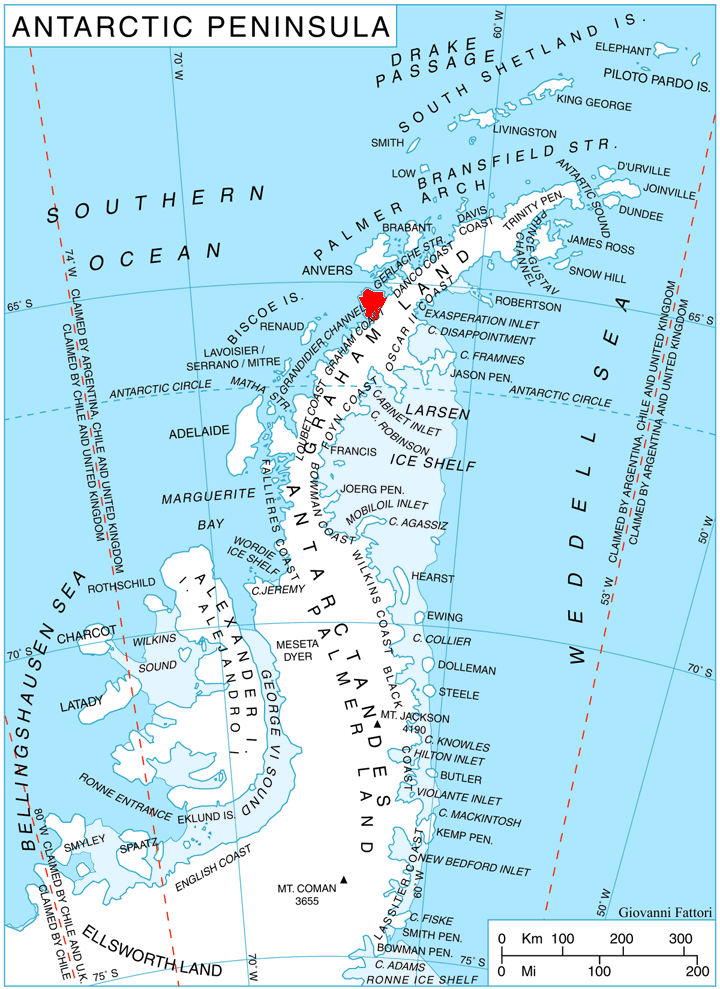
Location of Kyiv Peninsula in Graham Land, Antarctic Peninsula.

Glandaz Point (65°5′S 63°59′W) is a point forming the south side of the entrance to Deloncle Bay in Kyiv Peninsula, on the west coast of Graham Land, Antarctica. It was discovered by the Belgian Antarctic Expedition, 1897–99, was charted by the French Antarctic Expedition, 1903–05, and was named by Jean-Baptiste Charcot for A. Glandaz.
