= Blanchard Ridge =

Rock ridge in Antarctica

Coordinates: 65°12′S 64°4′W

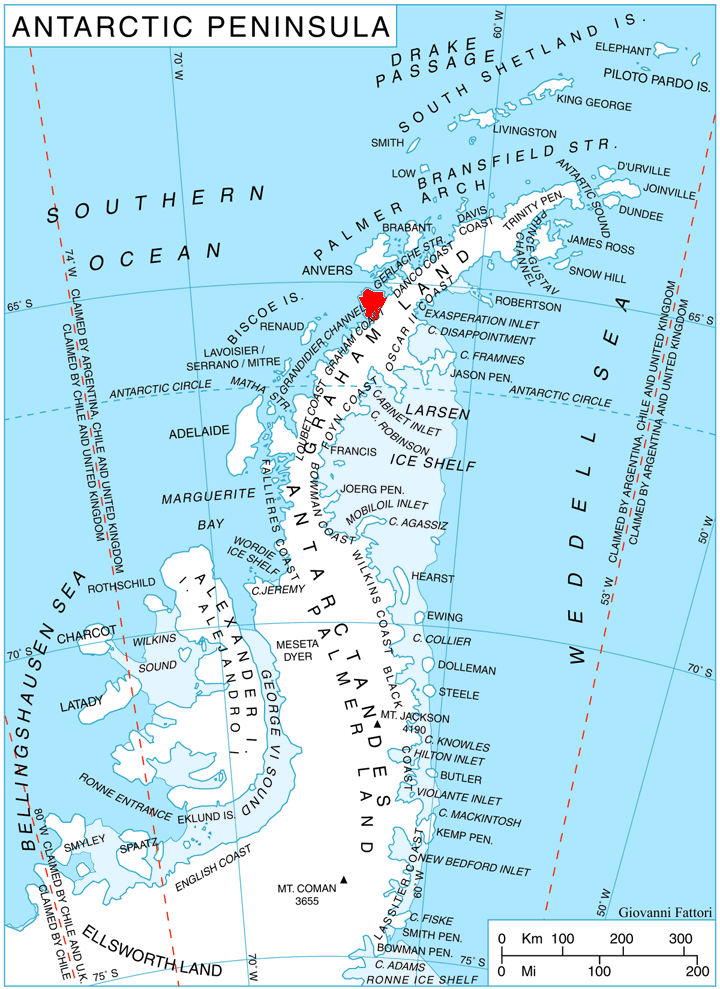
Location of Kyiv Peninsula in Graham Land, Antarctic Peninsula.

Blanchard Ridge is a rocky ridge, 520 metres (1,700 ft) high, at the north side of the mouth of Wiggins Glacier on Kyiv Peninsula on the west coast of Graham Land. It was mapped by the French Antarctic Expedition, 1908–10, and named by Jean-Baptiste Charcot for a Monsieur Blanchard, then French Consul at Punta Arenas.
