= Mount Matin =

Mountain in Graham Land, Antarctica

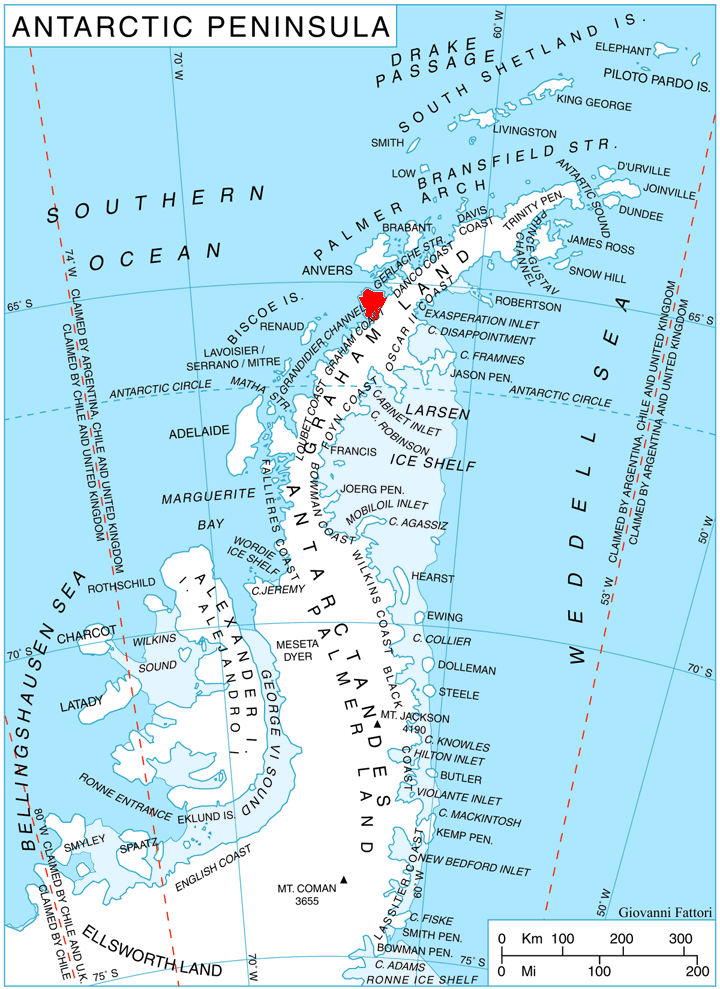
- Location of Kyiv Peninsula in Graham Land, Antarctic Peninsula

Highest point
- Elevation: 2,415 metres (7,920 ft)
- Prominence: 1,427 m (4,682 ft)
- Listing: Ribu
- Coordinates: 65°8′S 63°40′W

Geography
- Location: Kyiv Peninsula, Graham Land, Antarctica

Mount Matin is a massive, mainly snow-covered mountain which surmounts the mountainous divide north of Hotine Glacier on Kyiv Peninsula, on the west side of Graham Land, Antarctica. It was first charted by the French Antarctic Expedition, 1903–05, led by Jean-Baptiste Charcot, who named it after the newspaper Le Matin contributed generously to the cost of the expedition.

Mount Matin was climbed and descended on ski on December 5, 2010 via the south-west ridge by Phil Wickens, Derek Buckle, Mike Fletcher, Dave Wynne-Jones and Richmond MacIntyre of the 2010 Alpine Club Antarctic Expedition, who found the summit to be at 2,415 metres (7,920 ft).
