= Matins (disambiguation) =

Matins is the canonical hour ending at dawn in the Roman Catholic monastic Liturgy of the Hours.

Matins may also refer to:

== Religion ==
- Orthros, the equivalent office in the Eastern Churches
- Matins Gospel, the solemn chanting of a passage from the Four Gospels during Matins in the Orthodox and Byzantine Rite Eastern Catholic churches
- Morning Prayer (Anglican), often called Matins or Mattins
- Matins in Lutheranism, a morning order

== Poetry ==
- "Matins", the first of seven poems in the series "Horae Canonicae" by Scottish poet Donald Davie (1922–1995)
- Matins, a collection of thirty poems by Canadian poet Francis Joseph Sherman (1871–1926) published in 1896
- "Matins", any of seven non-sequential poems in Louise Glück's 1992 book, The Wild Iris

== See also ==
- Matin (disambiguation)
