= Cape Cloos =

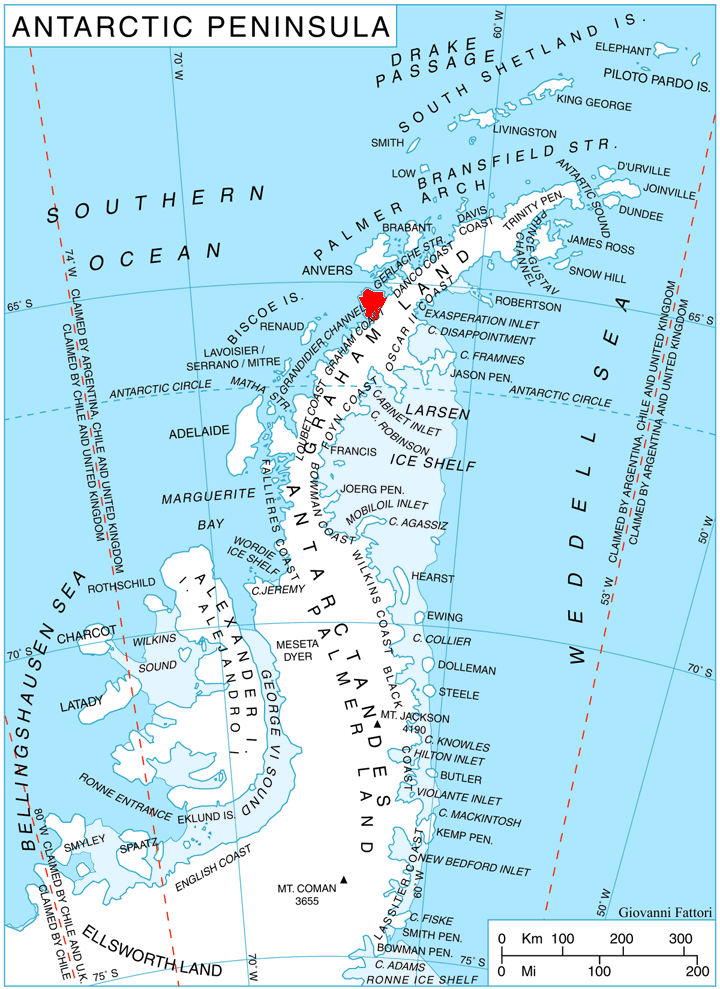
Location of Kyiv Peninsula in Graham Land, Antarctic Peninsula.

Cape Cloos (65°7′S 64°0′W) is a high rock cape fronting on Lemaire Channel and marking the north side of the entrance to Girard Bay on Kyiv Peninsula, on the west coast of Graham Land. It was discovered by the Belgian Antarctic Expedition, 1897–1899, under Gerlache, and named after M. Cloos, sometime Honorary Consul in Denmark.
