= Loubat Point =

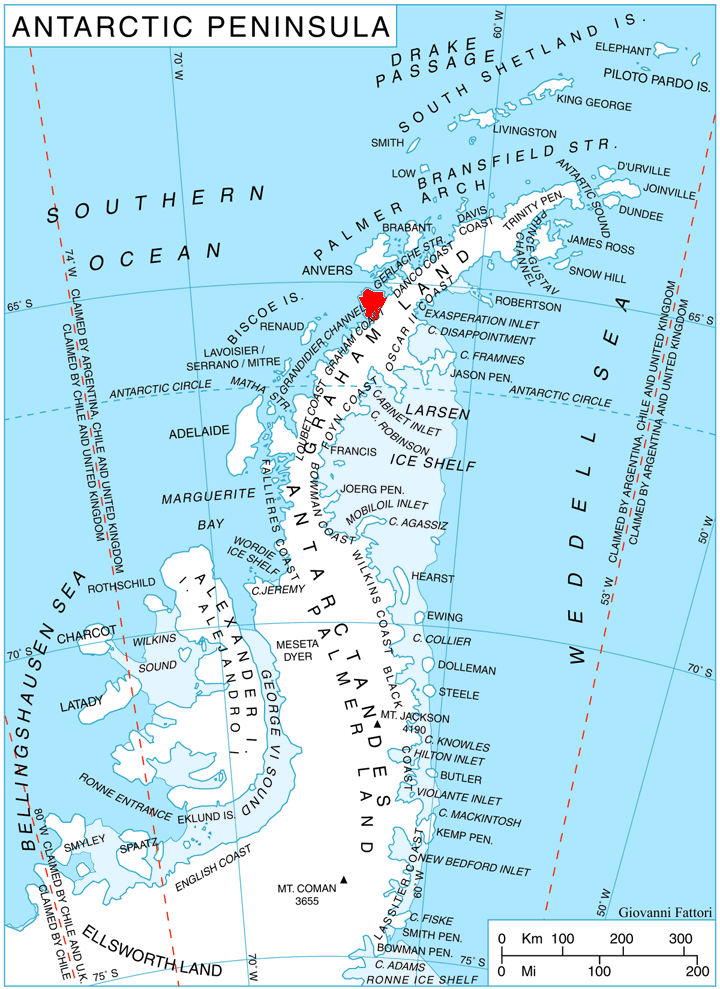
Location of Kyiv Peninsula in Graham Land, Antarctic Peninsula.

Loubat Point (65°4′S 63°56′W) is a point forming the north side of the entrance to Deloncle Bay in Kyiv Peninsula, on the west coast of Graham Land, Antarctica. While probably first seen by the Belgian Antarctic Expedition, 1897–99, it was resighted by the French Antarctic Expedition, 1903–05, and named by Jean-Baptiste Charcot for a Monsieur de Loubat.
