= Le Matin =

Le Matin (French pronunciation: [lə matɛ̃], The Morning) may refer to:

== Newspapers ==
=== Current newspapers ===
- Le Matin (Switzerland), a Swiss daily newspaper
- Le Matin (Senegal), a daily newspaper in Senegal
- Le Matin (Haiti), a daily newspaper in Haiti
- Le Matin (Morocco), a daily Moroccan newspaper

=== Former newspapers ===
- Le Matin (France), a French newspaper (1884–1944)
- Le Matin de Paris, a French daily newspaper (1977–1988)
- Le Matin (Acadian), a Canadian newspaper last published 1988

== Music ==
- "Le Matin", two compositions by Saint-Saëns
- Symphony No. 6 (Haydn), popularly known as "Le Matin"

== See also ==
- Matin (disambiguation)
