= Mount Demaria =

Mountain in Graham Land, Antarctica

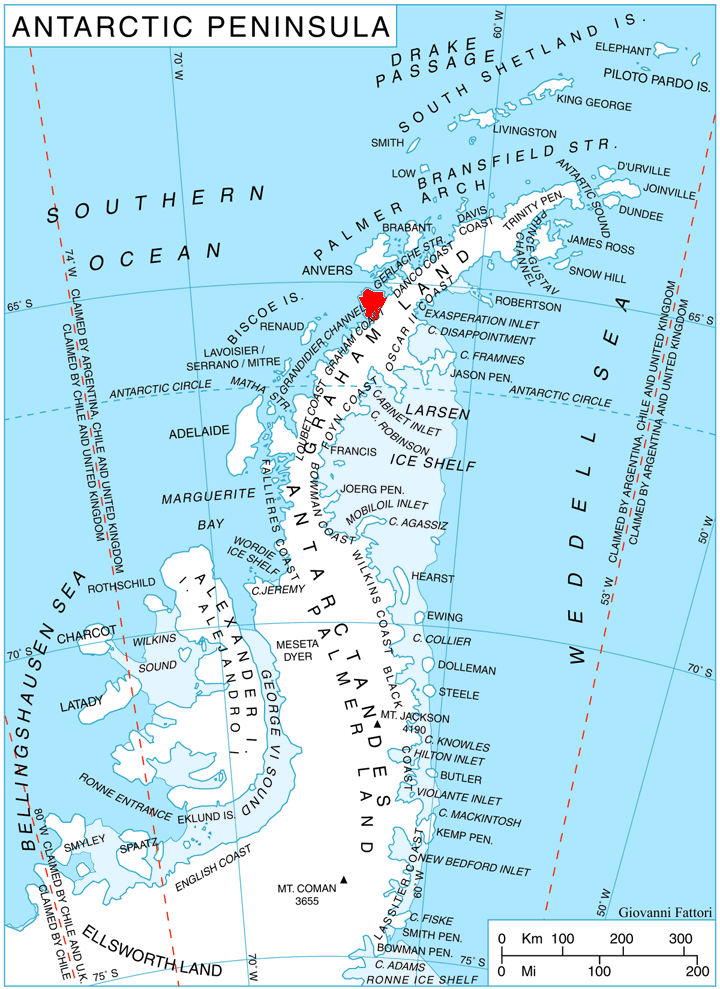
Location of Kyiv Peninsula in Graham Land, Antarctic Peninsula.

Mount Demaria (65°17′S 64°6′W) is a mountain with precipitous sides, 635 metres (2,080 ft) high, rising immediately southeast of Cape Tuxen on the west coast of Kyiv Peninsula in Graham Land. It was probably first sighted by the Belgian Antarctic Expedition of 1897–99. It was charted by the French Antarctic Expedition of 1903–05 and was named by Jean-Baptiste Charcot for the Demaria brothers, French developers of an anastigmatic lens used by the expedition's photographic section.

The first ascent was on 22 July 1979, and was completed by R. Ashley, R. Bowler, K. Bryne, D. Forsyth UK. The second ascent took place on 1 October 1979 by M. Brettle, A. Hawkins, J. Kerr, and J. Nutt.
