= False Cape Renard =

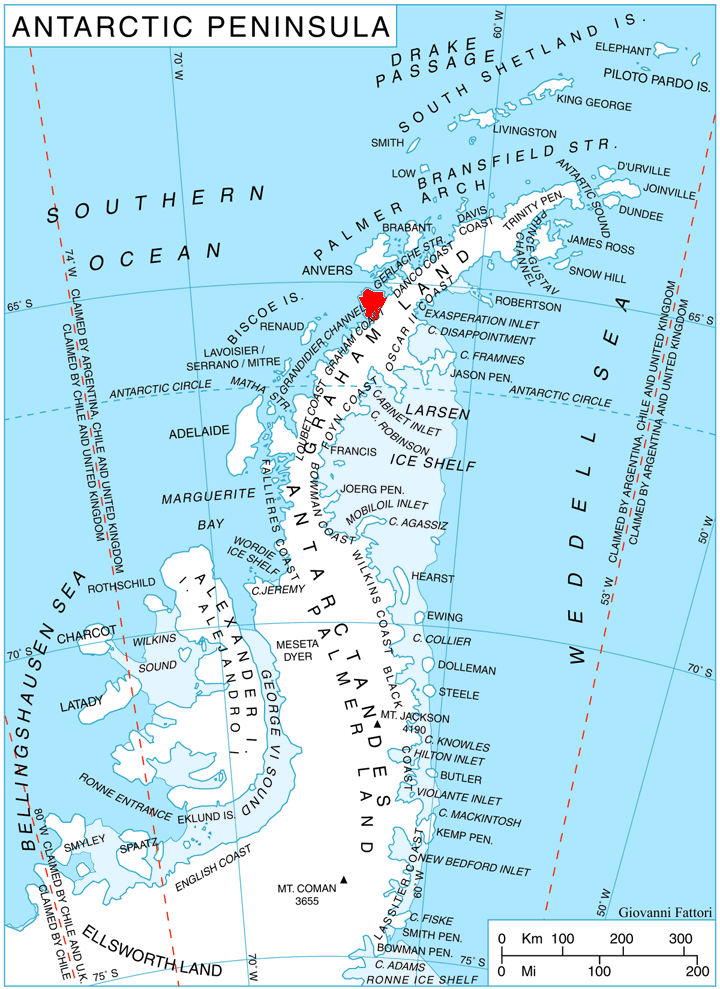
Location of Kyiv Peninsula in Graham Land, Antarctic Peninsula.

False Cape Renard (65°2′S 63°50′W) is a rocky cape 1.5 nautical miles (3 km) southwest of Cape Renard, on the northwest coast of Kyiv Peninsula, Graham Land. It was charted by the Belgian Antarctic Expedition under Gerlache, 1897–99. This feature and Cape Renard together were called "The Needles" by Henryk Arctowski, geologist, oceanographer and meteorologist with the Belgian expedition. Since the two capes are easily confused and need to be distinguished, a collective name is considered unsuitable. The name "False Cape Renard" was applied by the French Antarctic Expedition, 1908–10, under Jean-Baptiste Charcot.
