= Mount Tranchant =

Mountain in Graham Land, Antarctica

Mount Tranchant (65°14′S 64°5′W) is a small mountain or hill directly on the west coast of Graham Land. The feature marks the south side of the terminus of Wiggins Glacier. First charted by the French Antarctic Expedition, 1908–10, under J.B. Charcot who gave the descriptive name "Mont Tranchant" (sharp mountain or edge mountain).

The name Edge Hill was also assigned to the feature by the United Kingdom in 1911. It rises 285 metres (935 ft) from the sea.
