= Una Peaks =

Twin basalt towers on the Antarctic Peninsula

- Una's Tits
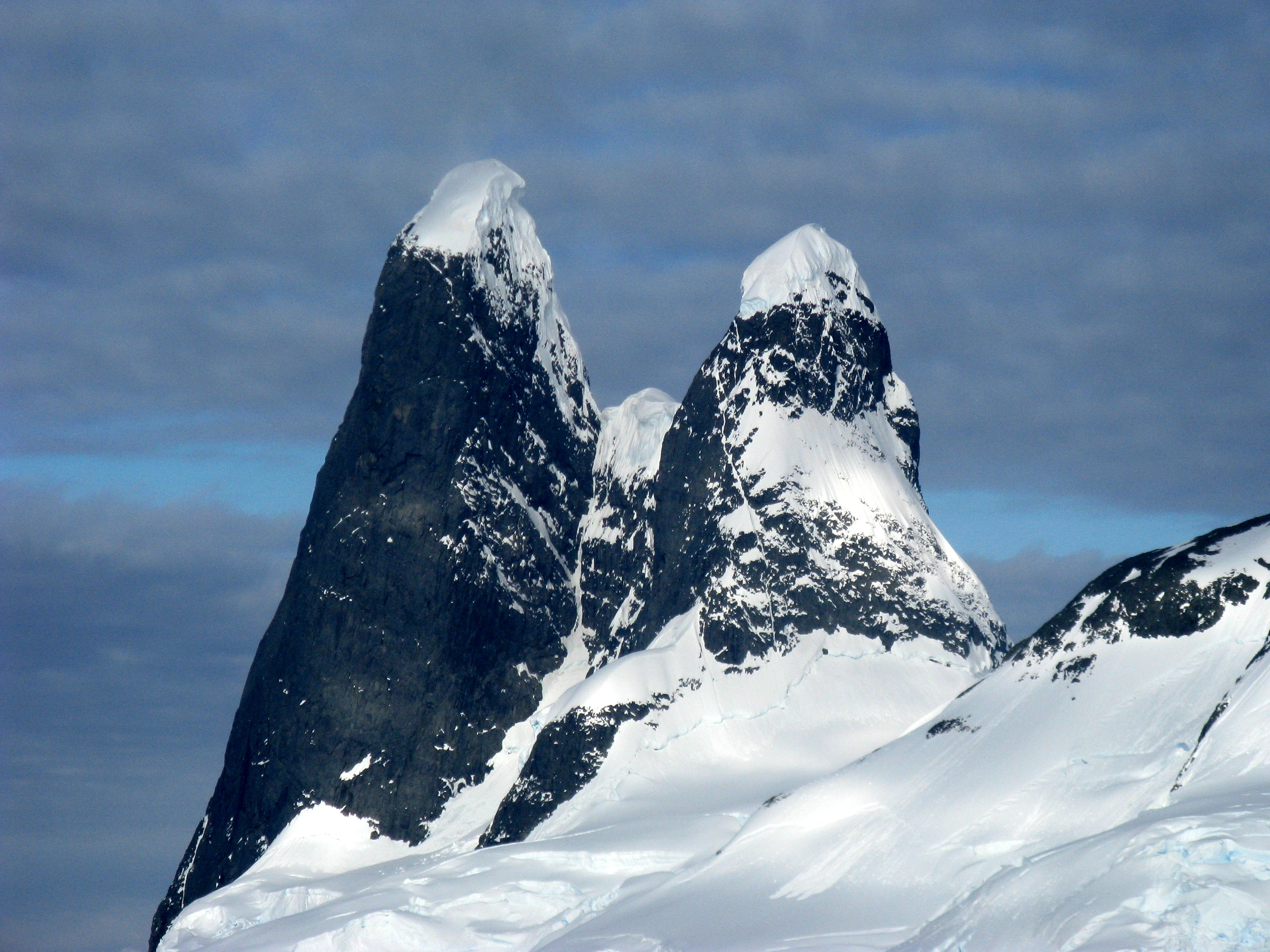
- Una's Tits, Lemaire Channel, January 2010

Highest point
- Elevation: 747 m (2,451 ft)
- Coordinates: 65°06′24″S 63°56′26″W

Geography
- Location within Antarctica
- Location: Antarctica

Climbing
- First ascent: 1999

Una Peaks, formerly known as Cape Renard Towers, are two towers of basalt, each topped by a cap of ice, guarding the northern entrance to the Lemaire Channel on the Antarctic Peninsula. With the highest summit at 747 metres (2,451 ft), The formation has been long colloquially known as "Una's Tits". The peaks appear on a British Antarctic Territory stamp although they are not identified as such. The individual towers are referred to as "buttresses".

Una Spivey was the name of a secretary in the governor's office in Stanley, Falkland Islands who was working for what is now the British Antarctic Survey. The tallest tower has only been summited once; this was by a German team in 1999 (Kurt Albert, Stefan Glowacz, Hans Martin Götz, Gerhard Heidorn, Holger Heuber and Jürgen Knappe).

== Gallery ==
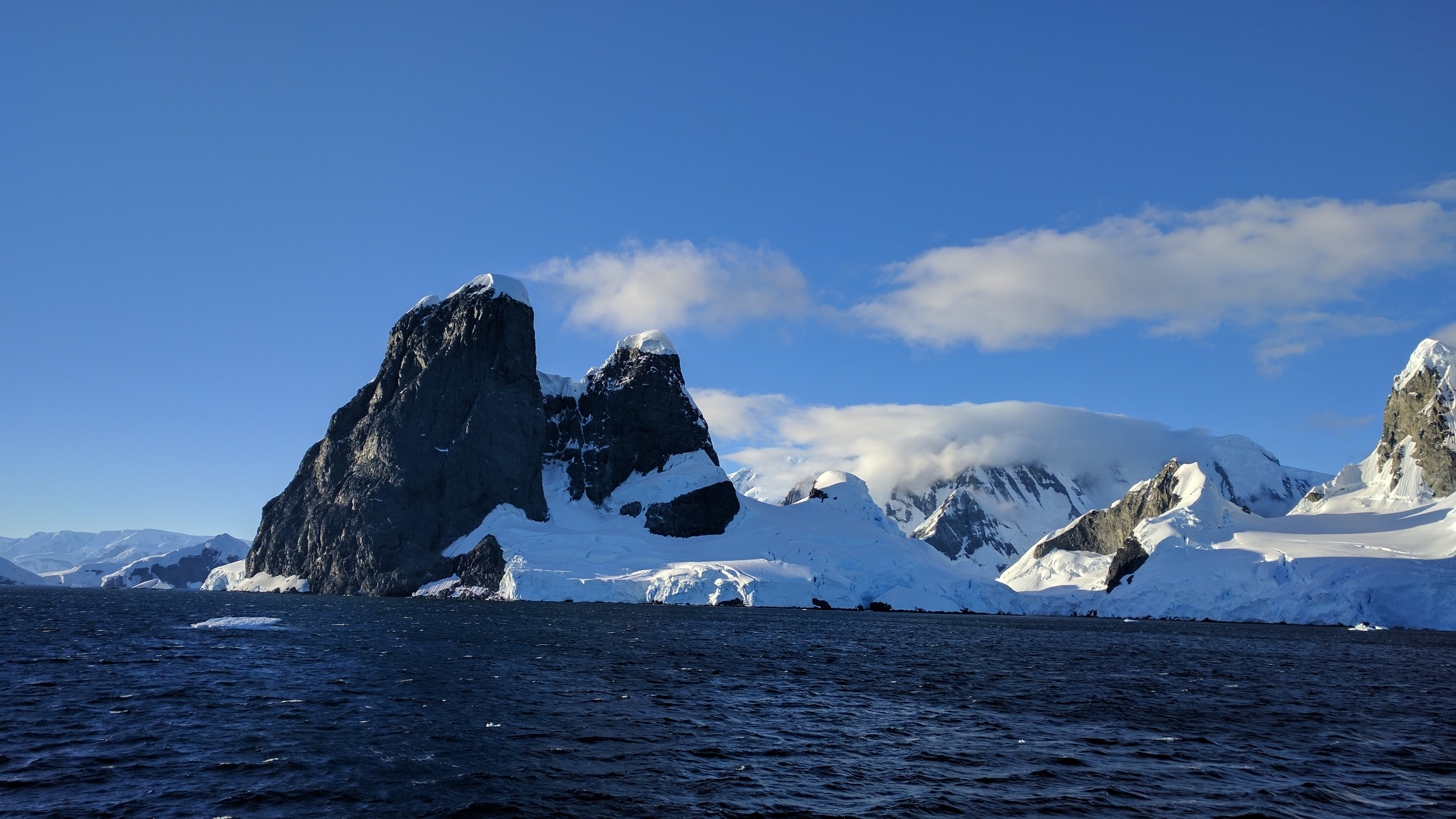

== See also ==
- Lemaire Channel
- Breast shaped hills

== Sources ==
- Lonely Planet, Antarctica: a Lonely Planet Travel Survival Kit, Oakland, CA: Lonely Planet Publications, 1996, p. 305
- Antarctica. Sydney: Reader's Digest, 1985, pp. 126–127.
- U.S. National Science Foundation, Geographic Names of the Antarctic, Fred G. Alberts, ed. Washington: NSF, 1980.
