= Duseberg Buttress =

Duseberg Buttress (65°10′S 64°6′W) is a conspicuous rocky cone, 500 metres (1,600 ft) high, standing at the southwest side of Mount Scott on the west coast of Graham Land, Antarctica. It was discovered by the Belgian Antarctic Expedition, 1897–99, and named "Cap Duseberg" by Gerlache. Aerial photos show no cape, only a rock buttress, evidently the feature Gerlache intended to name. It is one of many named rock formations of Graham Land.
