= Peter DeMaria =

American architect and artist

- Born: 24 October 1960 (age 65); Madison, New Jersey
- Education: University of Texas at Austin; Kean University
- Occupation: Architect
- Awards: American Institute of Architects; Design Excellence/Innovation (2022, 2011, 2009, 2007, 2005)
- Practice: DeMaria Design Associates

Peter DeMaria (born October 24, 1960, in Madison, New Jersey) is an American architect and artist known for his non-conventional use of materials and construction/fabrication methodologies.

== Early life and education ==
DeMaria was born in Madison, New Jersey. He earned a Bachelor of Arts in Fine Art from Kean University in 1982 and a Master of Architecture degree in 1986 from the University of Texas at Austin.

== Architectural style ==
DeMaria's container based work is seen "mainly as an 'experiment' at this time", said Bill Gati, a member of the American Institute of Architects Custom Residential Design Committee. "It's cutting-edge, and Architects who design with containers are considered mavericks and trail blazers". DeMaria dedicated five years to taking the messengers of consumerism (shipping containers) and converting them into role models for an environmental and economical housing solution." He compares his creations to Andy Warhol's prints, McDonald's hamburgers, and the textile block houses of Frank Lloyd Wright. "We are reinterpreting and re-presenting the best of these processes in a different medium ... a new process by which future construction projects will be delivered". His work follows no distinct style but he fuses prefabrication, principles that were professed by Buckminster Fuller and an experimental attitude regarding materials and systems. Like Fuller, he visualizes architecture fulfilling a critical force on the planet, "I've come to reject the limitations of sustainability. Sustainability isn't enough. Our buildings must be more than simply contributors to a more environmentally conscious society—they must become functioning icons that spearhead new advances." Dwell Magazine profiled his ideas on the Future of Prefab in which he stated:

Some people assume that yet-to-be-invented high-tech materials and systems will be the saviors of our construction industry. New technology can be great, but some of the answers to our building challenges are right in front of us. We need to look more closely at existing materials and systems from commercial construction and other industries and ask how they might be adapted, adjusted, or recycled to meet our domestic architecture needs. It’s less glamorous than creating renderings of new home designs, but we need to look at how to design efficient processes that leverage the economies of scale inherent in existing industrial components and systems.

DeMaria designed the Redondo Beach House departing from the historical and traditional sense of what constitutes "architecture" and professed "this project is the torch bearer for a new, more affordable method of design and construction — Architecture as a Product". The AIA has lauded his work, but his ideas have faced opposition from the professional and academic world of architecture - his blending of product, industrial and architectural design into a new hybrid, challenges the norm by which architecture is practiced.

== Career and recognition ==
He worked for Daniel, Mann, Johnson and Mendenhall briefly in 1990, prior to starting his own practice in Los Angeles, California in 1992. DeMaria received the RAND Corporation's First Prize Award in their 1997 Design Competition. In 2006, DeMaria designed the Redondo Beach House, the first two-story shipping container home in the U.S. With an approved structural system under the strict guidelines of the nationally recognized Uniform Building Code, the Redondo Beach House is composed of eight recycled ISO Cargo Containers. DeMaria's design received the American Institute of Architects (AIA) Honor in Excellence Award for Innovation in 2007.,". It is a hybrid home that has received awards, has been published internationally and is recognized as the first two story cargo container based project in the United States that legally complies with the Uniform Building Code. DeMaria was the recipient of the Bank of Manhattan Innovative Entrepreneur of the Year Award in recognition of his progressive and committed business development focused on alternative building methodologies and systems.

In 2008, DeMaria created Logical Homes LLC, a company that provides prefabricated homes that utilize the shipping container as the core structural elements.

In 2009, his interdisciplinary ideas and work became the focus of a Lexus advertising campaign for hybrid electric vehicles in the automotive industry. His design for the East Los Angeles/Boyle Heights Four Square Church Parsonage received a 2009 American Institute of Architects (AIA) Design Award.

In 2011, his design for RED BULL USA FMX-Data Center and Lounge received an AIA Design Award Citation.

In 2016, he was tapped by Max Azria to create start-up steel module based Prefab company, HBG Steel & Azria Homes. Over the course of three years of research and development, the DeMaria focused on developing an outsourced building module that would ultimately serve the homeless across the US. Reconnaissance within China and the development of a factory outside of Shanghai, led to HBG's "Prototype 1440 Model" as the first China outsourced single family home to be approved under the guidelines of the State of California Housing and Community Development Program. The 1440 Model was a hybrid steel module and was followed by additional approved single family residences and smaller apartment structures. The 1440 thrust open the gateway to multi-family residential projects that would have a larger and positive impact on the homeless challenge in Los Angeles. The tracking of his developments, from his early roots, are covered in a Stanford University-based Modlar Podcast. Culminating with three large scale LA projects, Hope on Lafayette, Hope on Western and Hope on Alvarado - each was born out of DeMaria's early studies with Azria. Focused on Mayor Eric Garcetti's Los Angeles Bridge Housing Program and Homeless Shelter initiative, DeMaria's prefab developments now serve as the core module for additional multi-family apartments planned for Los Angeles. Committed to a vision for a quality designed housing solution that serves the masses across the US and at a global scale, his merging of product design and architecture - a hybrid design-fabricate-assemble strategy - placed him at the forefront of innovative prefab systems and technology.

In 2020, he collaborated on the creation of prefab industry resource, TEAM Prefab - a global data-base that "champions Prefabrication sensibilities - redefining, expanding and revolutionizing the antiquated architecture + construction industries".

In 2022, DeMaria's Hope on Lafayette Homeless Village for Los Angeles Mayor Eric Garcetti's Bridge Housing Program . was recognized with an AIA Residential Design Award Citation. Designed in 2019, when he served as Chief Design Principal with HBG/Azria Homes, DeMaria teamed with HBG visionary founder, Max Azria, Danny Moizel, Pres. & Dir. of Construction, Damon Summers, Vice Pres., and a team of professionals to bring the first State of California approved multi-family/multi-story modular solution from overseas/China. Their hybrid steel modular system development culminated with a 2023 Modular Building Institute (MBI) First Place Design Award for the Hope on Lafayette Bridge Housing Project as well as an additional AIA Design Award for their Transitional Housing Project - Hope on Alvarado.

DeMaria has taught architecture and lectured across the US since 1995 as a part-time faculty member in the Design Dept. at California State University at Long Beach and as an adjunct professor at the University of Texas at Austin, School of Architecture.

== Works ==
- Neeson Residence, Hollywood Hills, CA, 1995
- RAND Corporation, Santa Monica, CA, 1997
- Amor Road Residence, Hollywood Hills, CA, 2002
- Redondo Beach House, Redondo Beach, CA, 2007
- East Los Angeles Four Square Church Parsonage, Boyle Heights, CA, 2009
- RedBull Motocross Team Center, Lake Piru, CA, 2011
- Hope on Alvarado, Los Angeles, CA, 2021
- Hope on Lafayette, Los Angeles, CA, 2021
