= Deloncle Bay =

Bay in Antarctica

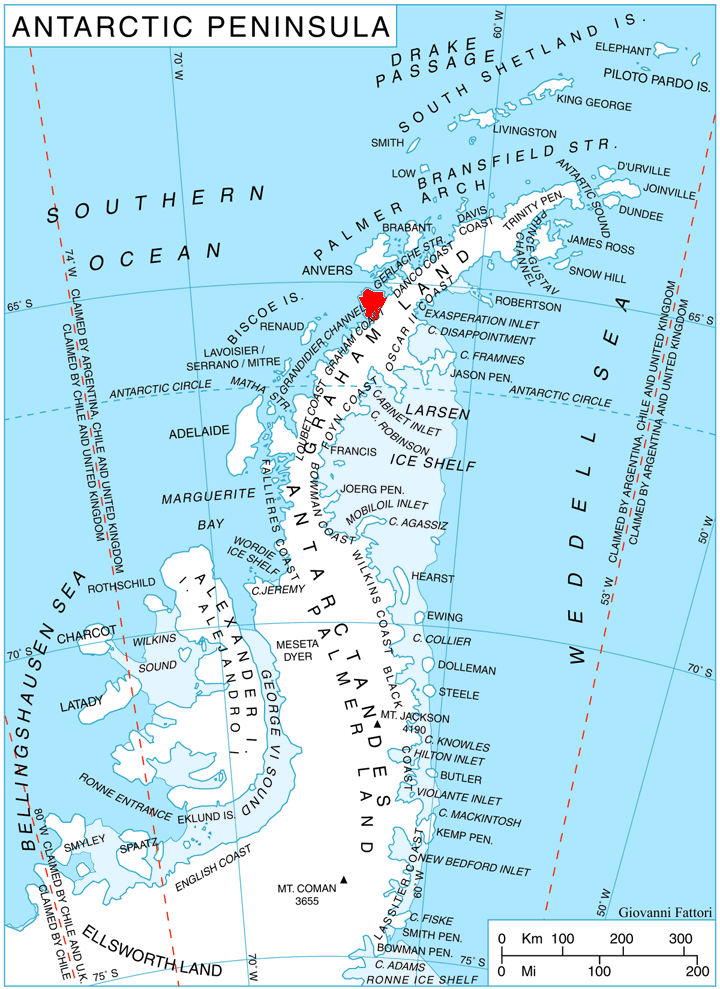
Location of Kyiv Peninsula in Graham Land, Antarctic Peninsula.

Deloncle Bay (65°5′S 63°56′W) is a bay, 1.5 nautical miles (3 km) long, indenting the northwest coast of Kyiv Peninsula in Graham Land between Loubat Point and Glandaz Point, and opening on Lemaire Channel opposite Booth Island. It was discovered by the Belgian Antarctic Expedition, 1897–99. Recharted by the French Antarctic Expedition, 1903–05, it was named by Jean-Baptiste Charcot for François Deloncle, a French diplomat.

== Gallery ==
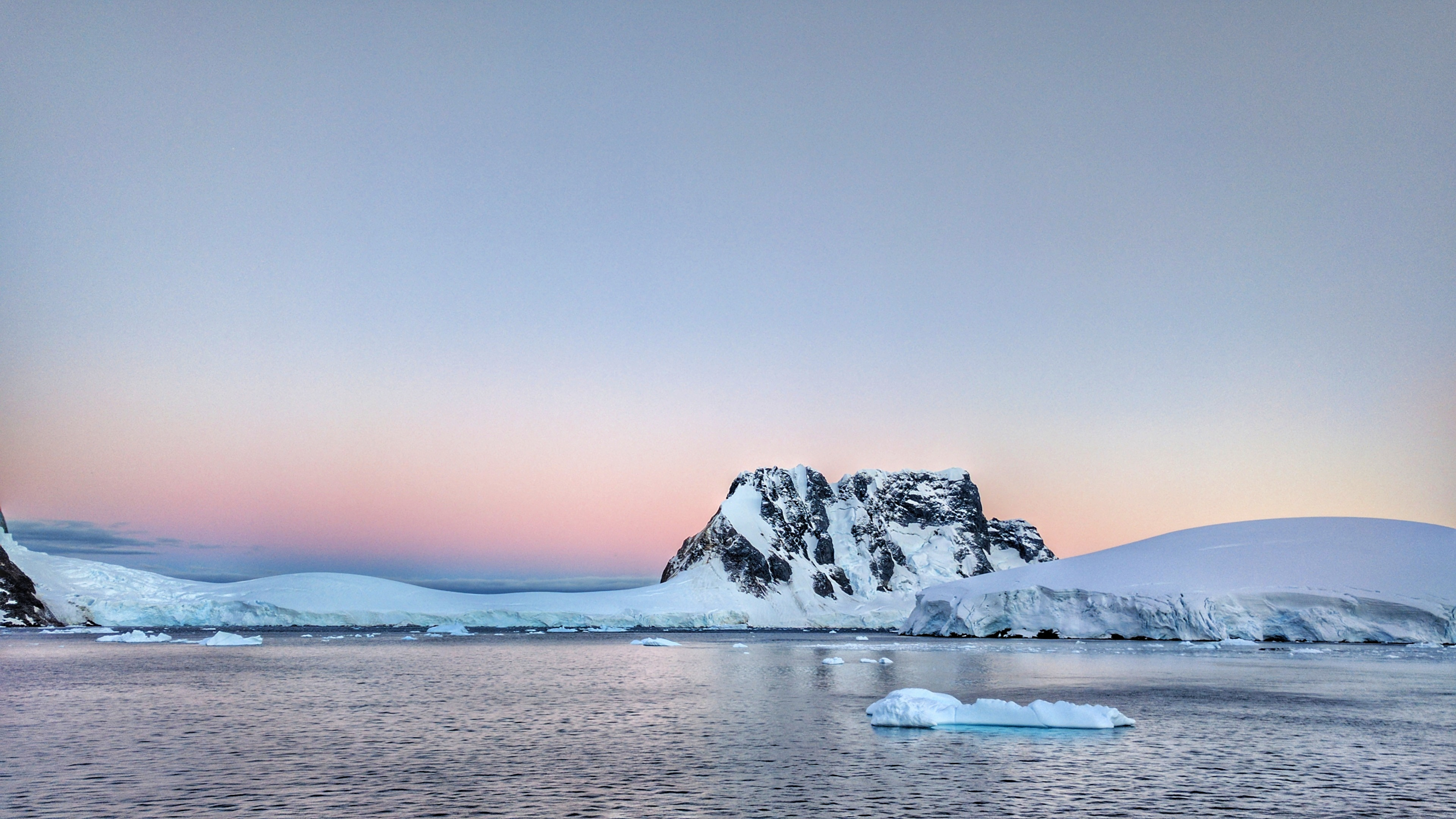

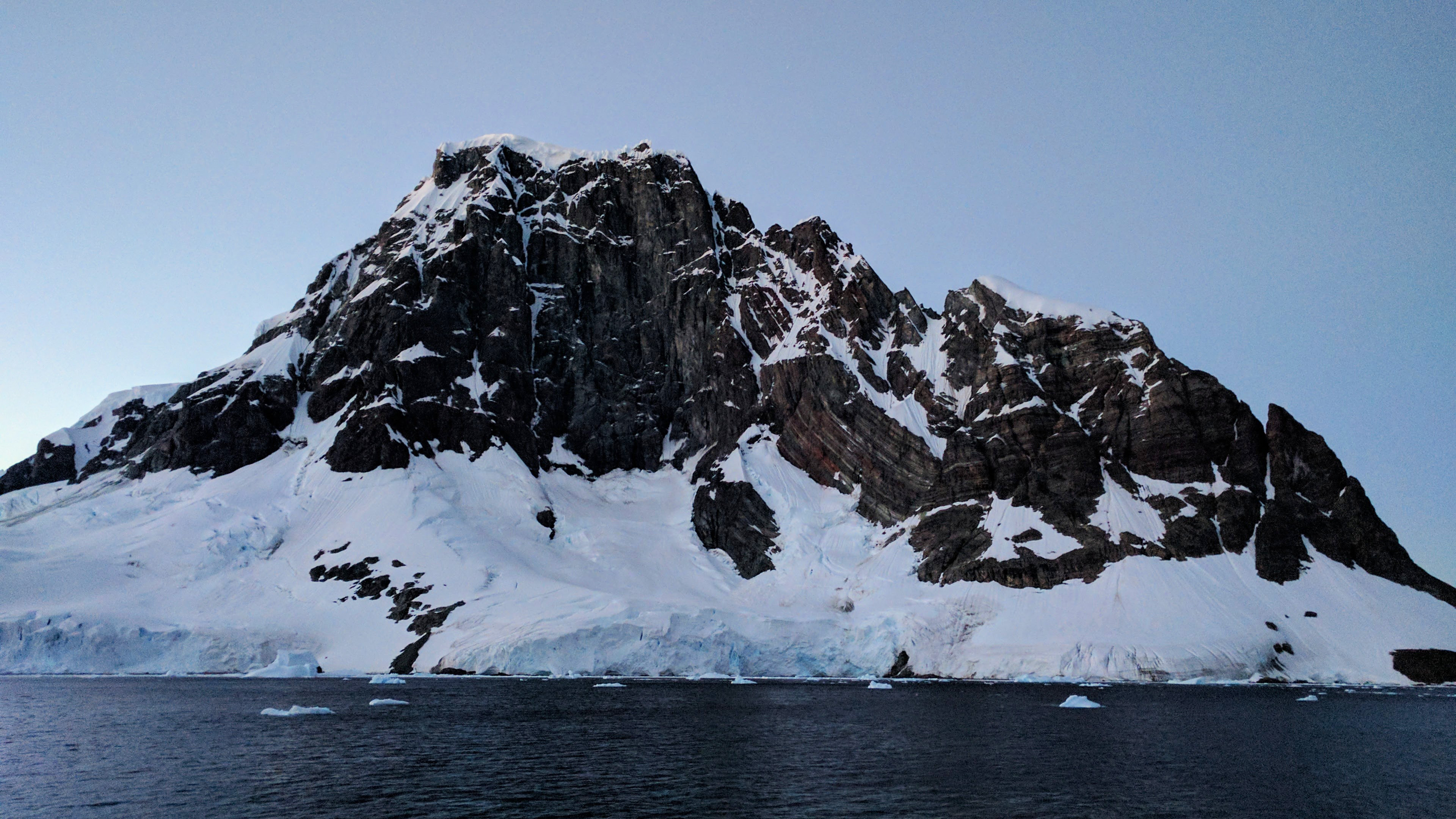
