= Girard Bay =

Bay in Antarctica

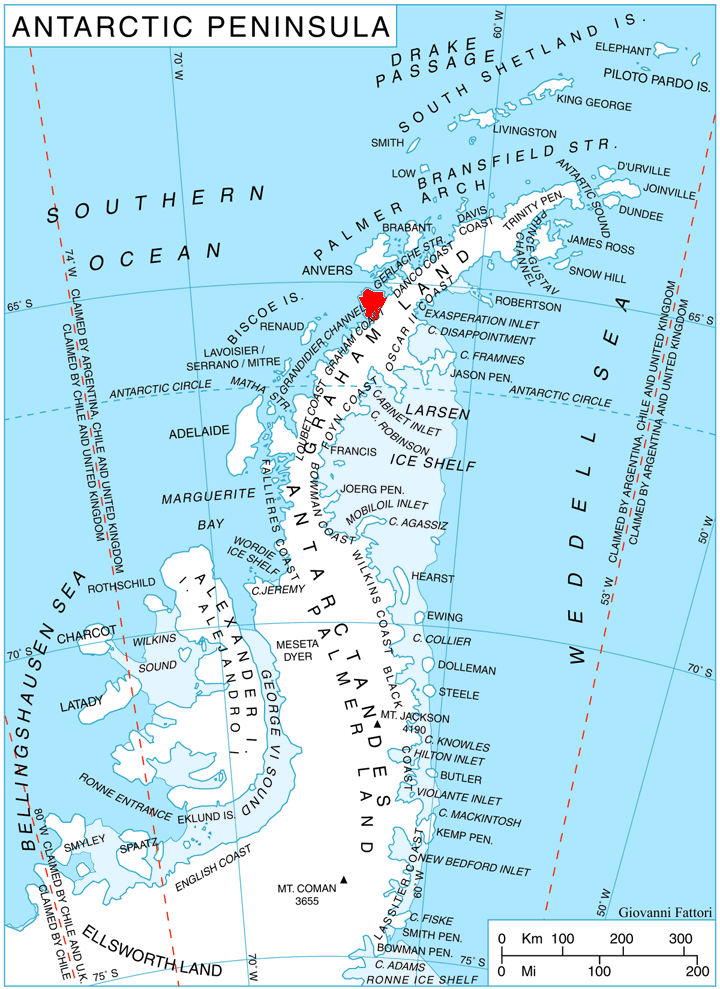
Location of Kyiv Peninsula in Graham Land, Antarctic Peninsula.

Girard Bay (65°8′S 64°0′W) is a bay 2 nautical miles (4 km) long and 1 nautical mile (2 km) wide, indenting the northwest coast of Kyiv Peninsula, Graham Land, between Cape Cloos and Mount Scott. It was discovered by the Belgian Antarctic Expedition, 1897–99, and was named by the French Antarctic Expedition, 1903–05, under Jean-Baptiste Charcot, for Jules Girard of the Paris Société de Géographie.
