= De Maria =

De Maria is a surname. Notable people with the surname include:

- Alexandre De Maria (1904–1968), Brazilian-born and Italian footballer
- Ercole de Maria (died c. 1640), Italian Baroque painter
- Isidoro de María (1815–1906), Uruguayan writer, historian, journalist, politician and diplomat
- De María (footballer) (1896-unknown), João de María, Brazilian footballer
- Luca De Maria (born 1989), Italian rower
- Mauricio de Maria y Campos (born 1943), Mexican diplomat
- Walter De Maria (1935–2013), American artist, sculptor, illustrator and composer
