= Kyiv Peninsula =

Peninsula in northern Antarctica

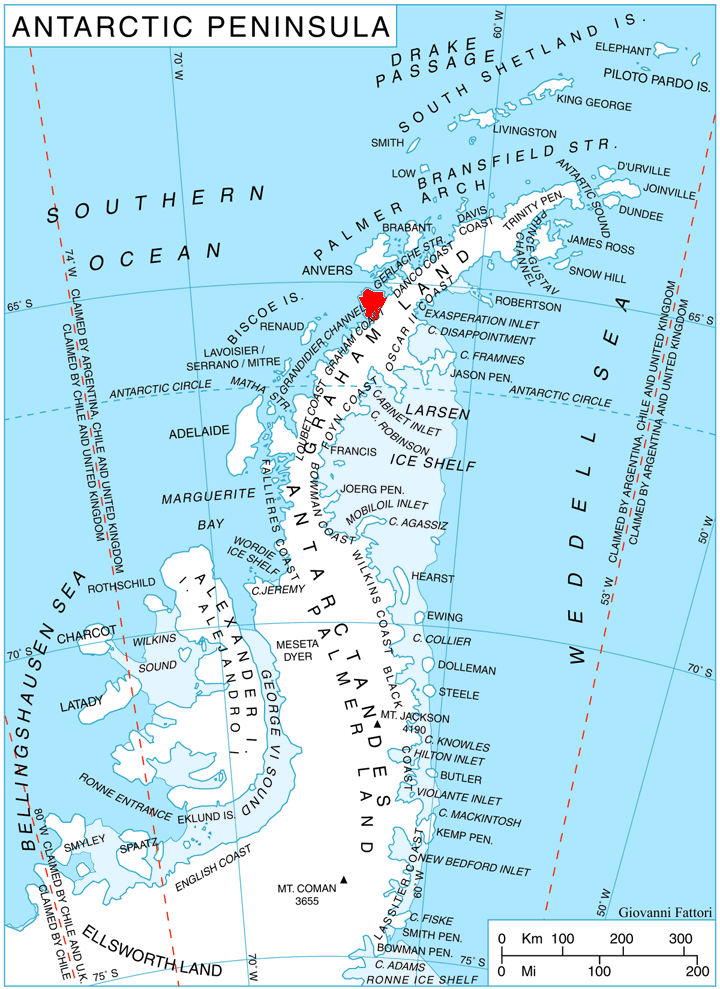
Location of Kyiv Peninsula in Graham Land, Antarctic Peninsula

Kyiv Peninsula (Ukrainian: півострів Київ, IPA: [piˈwɔst⁽ʲ⁾r⁽ʲ⁾iu̯ ˈkɪjiu̯]) is the predominantly ice-covered, oval shaped peninsula projecting 35 km in northwest direction from the west side of Graham Land, Antarctic Peninsula. It is bounded by Flandres Bay to the northeast and Beascochea Bay to the southwest, and separated from Wilhelm Archipelago to the northwest by Lemaire Channel and Penola Strait. The peninsula's north extremity Cape Renard divides Graham Coast to the southwest from Danco Coast to the northeast. Mount Tranchant and Mount Demaria are found on the west coast of the peninsula.

== Etymology ==
The feature was first described and named in 2010 by the Antarctic Place-names Commission of Bulgaria after the capital city of Ukraine, in connection with the Ukrainian Antarctic base Vernadsky situated on nearby Galindez Island. The original naming was done in Bulgarian (Bulgarian: полуостров Киев, romanized: poluostrov Kiev, IPA: [poɫuˈɔstrof ˈkɪɛf]). Later, the name was adopted also by Ukraine in 2020 and translated Kyiv Peninsula. In 2022 the Antarctic Place-Names Committee added the Spelling Kyiv Peninsula to the Antarctic gazetteer (along with the name Vernadsky Station for the former Faraday Station).

== Location ==
Kyiv Peninsula is centred at 65°15′00″S 63°41′00″W. British mapping in 1976.

== Maps ==
- British Antarctic Territory. Scale 1:200000 topographic map. DOS 610 Series, Sheet W 65 62. Directorate of Overseas Surveys, Tolworth, UK, 1976
- Brabant Island to Argentine Islands. Scale 1:250000 topographic map. British Antarctic Survey, 2008
- Antarctic Digital Database (ADD). Scale 1:250000 topographic map of Antarctica. Scientific Committee on Antarctic Research (SCAR). Since 1993, regularly upgraded and updated
