= Benalla Football Club =

Names
- Full name: Benalla Football Netball Club
- Nickname: Saints
- Former nickname: Demons
- Motto: Never give up

Club details
- Founded: 1871; 155 years ago
- Colours: Red White Black
- Competition: Ovens & Murray Football League (1920-1930), (1946–1997); Goulburn Valley Football League (1940, 1998–)
- President: Geoff Hill
- Coach: Nicholas Pearson
- Premierships: 20 (senior football)
- Ground: Benalla Show Grounds (capacity: 10,000)

Uniforms
Home

Other information
- Official website: https://bssc.tidyhq.com/

The Benalla Football Netball Club, nicknamed the Saints, is an Australian rules football and netball club based in Benalla, Victoria. Its football and netball teams currently compete in the Goulburn Valley Football League.

== History ==
Benalla Football Club

The first published evidence of a club meeting was in 1871, to arrange a local football match on the Queen's Birthday holiday.

Football in Benalla appeared to of lapsed between 1872 and 1877, then the football club was re-formed in April 1878, with a meeting at Hamilton's Hotel when Mr. D.G. McC. O'Leary was elected as president. "The first and inaugurating match of Benalla FC" was played on the Benalla Recreation Reserve on Saturday, 27 April 1878.

In May, 1878, Carlton Football Club played a match against a North Eastern Victorian team at Benalla.

In May 1882, Benalla hosted a match between the Melbourne Football Club and a North Eastern representative team, with Melbourne winning a tight contest.

In 1883, Benalla FC played their home games on the oval adjoining the Benalla East State School and "have given amusement to the public during many a dreary Saturday".

In 1884 and 1885 the club's colours were a "blue guernsey and red and blue hose and cap".

In 1886, Essendon Football Club played a representative team from the North East of Victoria at the Benalla Recreation Reserve, which resulted in a win to Essendon.

Benalla initially played in the North Eastern Football Association in 1892 and won their first premiership in 1895 (unbeaten premiers), the first of three consecutive premierships.

In 1896, club patron's included John Alston Wallace (MLC) and Thomas Kennedy (MLA).

In 1897, Benalla's colours were blue, white and black.

Benalla FC went into recess from 1900 to 1902, with the Benalla Half Holiday FC and the Benalla Federals FC both playing competition football in these years.

In September 1908, Benalla's 28 year old captain and local Police Constable, James Cummins, along with Mounted Constable Daly, both drowned at the Benalla Waterworks Trust Weir.

In 1911, Benalla FC were not admitted into the Yarrawonga & District Football Association & went into recess, so as a result a new club was formed in Benalla, known as Benalla & Railway United FC referred to as "Benalla United" in local newspapers. This new club entered the Benalla Wednesday FA in 1911.

From 1919 to 1923, Benalla's colours were green and gold.

Benalla first entered the Ovens & Murray Football League in 1922 with their association continuing until 1928.

The O&MFL played Carlton in Wangaratta in 1922, resulting in a close win to Carlton, with three Benalla players representing the O&MFL.

In June, 1925, Benalla FC offered Cyril Gambetta their coaching job, but St.Kilda refused to clear him

In 1927, the club's colours were altered to red and white and Mr. J Skelton was elected a life patron. Fitzroy 18.7 - 105 defeated Benalla 9.9 - 65 in Benalla in late September, in what was a highlight for the local football supporters.

Mr. Les Hill was given a testimonial by the Benalla FC in 1927, after 17 years of service as a player.

At the club's 1929 AGM, Benalla Rovers FC took over the running of football in Benalla and their senior team was named the Benalla Rovers in 1929 and they wore a vertical black and gold striped jumper, known as the Tigers in the O & M in 1929 and 1930.

Between 1931 and 1941, Benalla's senior team played off in ten senior football grand finals, winning seven premierships. The only season Benalla missed playing in a grand final was in 1934 when they lost the first semi final to Wilby by one point in the Benalla Mulwala Football Association, in a real golden era for the club.

In 1931, Bernie Squires won the senior grade best and fairest award, while Dave Smith won the reserves grade best and fairest award.

In 1933, Benalla was known as the "Tigers" and lost a close match against Collingwood in October, 1933.

In 1940, Benalla 16.16 - 106 defeated Rushworth 11.16 – 82 to win their first senior Goulburn Valley Football League premiership in their first year in the GVFL.

Former 1930 and 1931 Benalla Junior premiership player, Jim Howell died in a Japanese Prison Camp in 1945.

From 1948 to 1997, Benalla were known as the Demons after they changed their jumper to a red jumper with a white V.

In late 1952, arrangements were made to set up a Benalla Junior Football League (BJFL) to start in 1953, with former Benalla FC coach, Ken Walker elected as the first president of the BJFL. This decision led to Benalla FC not fielding a Thirds team in the Benalla & District Football League.

In 1953, the O&MFL introduced a second eighteen (Reserves) competition for the first time, which meant that Benalla Reserves had to pull out of the Benalla Tungamah Football League.

In 1961, Benalla Football Club's Chiswell Pavilion was built and served the club well over the next 50 odd years, when it was replaced with the Lakeside Community Centre and changerooms in 2011. Charlie Chiswell was a former club president in the early 1960s and was instrumental in funding the building through a debenture scheme. The old Chiswell Pavilion was demolished in 2021, with only the front verandah remaining as a shelter.

When Benalla FC moved from the Ovens and Murray Football League to the Goulburn Valley Football League in 1998, they had to change their club colours and guernsey, which was to mirror the colours of the St Kilda Football Club.

When Australian Rules Football really took in the North East of Victoria in the late 1880s and early 1890s, a number of local football clubs were formed. Some of these local clubs, listed below played in local competitions and either merged with the Benalla Football Club or later folded. These clubs formed a valuable part of the local grassroots football history of the Benalla region.

Benalla Half Holiday Football Club (1899 to 1902 & 1908 & 1909)

The Benalla Half Holiday FC was formed as a junior club in May, 1899, wearing a blue jumper with a yellow sash. The club's jumper colors were changed to red, white and blue at a meeting in April, 1900. The club played in the Benalla Wednesday (Half Holiday) FA and wore maroon jumpers with white knicks in 1908.

Benalla Federals Football Club (1902 & 1903)

The Benalla Federals FC amalgamated with the Railways FC in 1902 and played a pivotal role as Benalla's main Saturday competition football club in 1902 and 1903, when they played in the Moira Football Association.

Benalla Gymnasium Football Club (1907 - 1912)

Formed in 1907, they went onto win three premierships in the Benalla Wednesday (Half Holiday) Football Association in 1908, 1910 and 1912. They then merged with Benalla & Railway United Football Club in 1913 to re-form Benalla Football Club.

Benalla East Stars Football Club (1907)

On Saturday, 15 June 1907, at the Five Alls Hotel, Benalla, the Benalla East Stars Football Club was formed and played in the Glenrowan Football Association for one season only, with Five Alls Hotel owner, Mr. Jack Bowden elected as president. The club played their home games behind the Benalla Five Alls Hotel.

Benalla & Railway United Football Club (1911 & 1912)

The Benalla & Railway United FC "Benalla United" was formed in 1911, decided on black and white hoops as their club jumper and would enter a team the Benalla Wednesday Football Association. Euroa Football Club won the 1911 Wednesday Football Association premiership and the Benalla Gymnasium FC defeated Benalla United in the 1912 grand final.

In 1913, local footballers wanted to play in a local Saturday competition, so Benalla United and Benalla Gymnasium merged and was reformed as Benalla Football Club, was admitted into the Yarrawonga District Football Association and played in the green and gold colours.

Benalla Rovers Football Club (1920 to 1930) & (1976 to 1989)

The Benalla Rovers were formed in 1920, when the Benalla Junior FC (formed in 1919) changed their name to Benalla Rovers FC at the AGM. Benalla Rovers FC won the 1920 and 1921 premiership in the North East Line Football Association. Benalla Rovers lost the 1922 Yarrawonga Line Football Association grand final to Devenish. In 1923, Benalla Rovers decided to change their colours to yellow and black, with black knickers. Remarkably, Benalla Rovers went through the 1923 season without a defeat to claim the Yarrawonga Line Football Association premiership.

Benalla Rovers were runners up to Yarrawonga in 1927, then won the 1928 Yarrawonga Line Football Association premiership.

In 1929, the Benalla Rovers FC took full control of the Benalla FC, including a debt of £60. The club entered Rovers A into the Ovens and Murray Football League, Rovers B played in the Yarrawonga Line Football Association and the Benalla Juniors played in the new Benalla District Football League.

In 1930, Benalla Rovers A played in the Ovens and Murray Football League, while Rovers B lost the Yarrawonga Line Football Association grand final to St. James, while the Benalla Juniors won the 1930 Benalla District Football League premiership, defeating Swanpool.

At the club's 1931 AGM, the club's secretary would not present the balance sheet due the auditor refusing to sign it, who later resigned. The club's name was then changed back to the “Benalla Football Club”.

Benalla Juniors Football Club (1929 to 1931)

The Benalla Juniors played in the Benalla District Football League from 1929 to 1931, playing in three consecutive grand finals, winning premierships in 1930 and 1931, wearing the purple and gold colours.

They changed their name to the Benalla Imperials FC in 1932 and joined the Euroa Line Football Association.

Benalla Imperials Football Club (1932 & 1933)

Benalla Imperials were beaten by Benalla Football Club in the 1933 Euroa Line Football Association grand final.

Benalla Imperials merged with the Benalla Football Club in 1934 and Benalla Seniors played in the Benalla Mulwala FA, while the Benalla Reserves played in the Benalla Yarrawonga Lines FA in 1934.

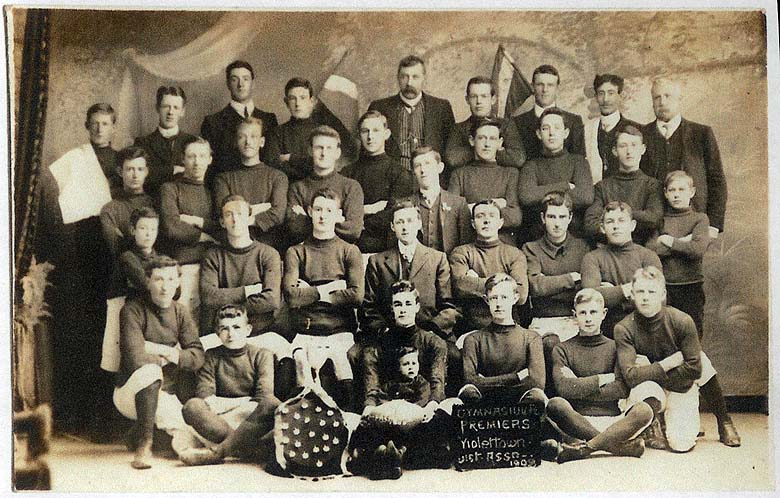
1908 Violet Town & District Football Association Premiers: Gymnasium FC

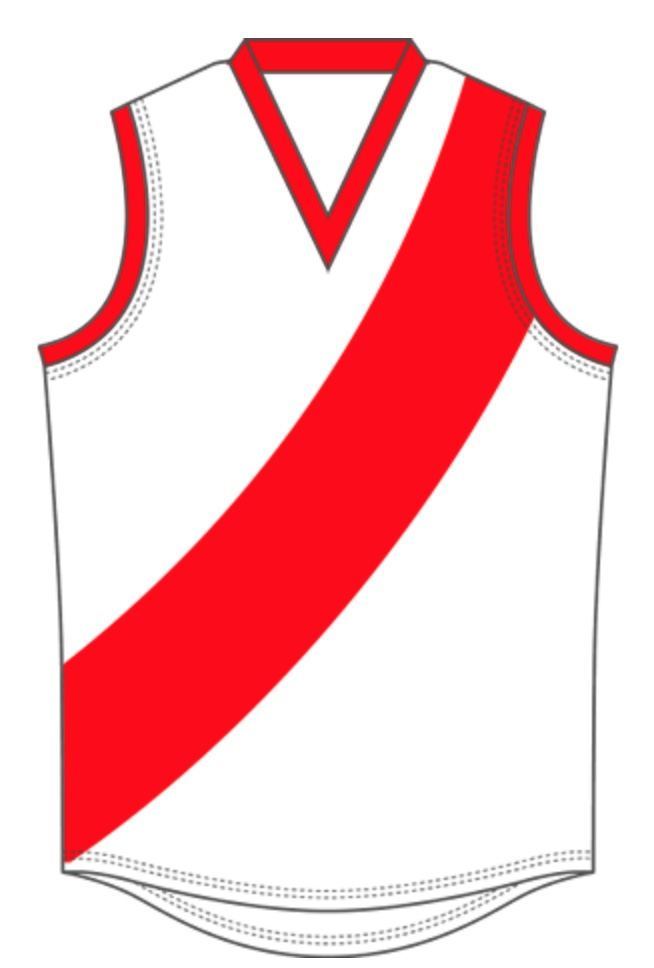
Benalla's Jumper: 1927 & 1928

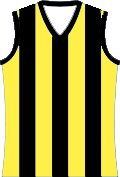
Benalla Rovers' O&M Jumper: 1929 & 1930

Benalla's Jumper: 1946 & 1947

Benalla's Jumper: 1948 to 1997

== Competitions timeline ==
Benalla Football Club
Seniors

- 1871 - Club was formed
- 1872 - 1877 - No published newspapers reports during this period.
- 1878 - 1885 - Club reformed and played friendly matches against other local towns and clubs.
- 1886 - William Collins Cup
- 1887 - 1891: ?
- 1892 - 1898: North Eastern Football Association
- 1899 - Devenish Football Association
- 1900 - 1902: Benalla FC in recess
- 1900 & 1901 - Thoona District Football Association (Benalla Half Holiday FC)
- 1902 & 1903 - Moira Football Association (Benalla Federals FC)
- 1904 - Brigg's Challenge Cup (Benalla "A" team: Benalla Wednesday Football Association)
- 1904 & 1905 - Moira Football Association (Benalla FC)
- 1906 - 1909 - Benalla Yarrawonga Football Association
- 1910 - North Eastern Football Association
- 1911 & 1912 - Benalla FC in recess. Benalla decided not to enter the North Eastern FA, but then were not admitted into the Yarrawonga & District FA, which left Benalla FC without a competition to play in.
- 1913 & 1914 - Yarrawonga & District Football Association
- 1915 - The Line Football Association
- 1916 - 1918 - Club in recess due to World War 1
- 1919 - Dookie & Line Football Association
- 1920 & 1921 - Benalla Yarrawonga Line Football Association
- 1922 - 1928 - Ovens & Murray Football League
- 1929 & 1930 - Ovens & Murray Football League (Benalla Rovers FC)
- 1931 - 1933 - Euroa District Football Association
- 1934 - 1937 - Benalla Mulwala Football Association
- 1938 & 1939 - Benalla Tungamah Football League
- 1940 - Goulburn Valley Football Association
- 1941 - Benalla Patriotic Football League
- 1942 - 1944 - Club in recess due to World War Two
- 1945 - Benalla Patriotic Football League
- 1946 - 1997 - Ovens & Murray Football League
- 1998 - 2019 - Goulburn Valley Football League
- 2020 - Benalla FC in recess due to the COVID-19 pandemic
- 2021 - 2023: Goulburn Valley Football League

Reserves

- 1904 - Brigg's Challenge Cup / Benalla Wednesday FA (Benalla "B" team)
- 1909 - Benalla Wednesday Football Association (Benalla "B")
- 1929 & 1930: Yarrawonga Line Football Association
- 1931 - 1934: Benalla Mulwala Line Football Association
- 1946 - Benalla & District Football League
- 1947 - Murray Valley North East Football League
- 1948 - 1952: Benalla Tungamah Football League
- 1953 - 1997: Ovens & Murray Football League
- 1998 - 2019: Goulburn Valley Football League
- 2020 - Benalla FC in recess due to the COVID-19 pandemic
- 2021 - 2025: Goulburn Valley Football League

Thirds

- 1947 - 1952: Benalla & District Football League
- 1973 - 1997: Ovens & Murray Football League
- 1998 - 2019: Goulburn Valley Football League
- 2020 - Benalla FC in recess due to the COVID-19 pandemic
- 2021 - 2023: Goulburn Valley Football League

Benalla Half Holiday Football Club

- 1900 & 1901 - Thoona District Football Association (Benalla Half Holiday FC)
- 1903 - 1907: Club was most likely in recess
- 1908 & 1909: Benalla Wednesday Football Association

Benalla Federals Football Club

- 1902 & 1903: Moira Football Association

Benalla East Stars Football Club (1907)

- 1907 - Glenrowan Football Association

Benalla Gymnasium Football Club

- 1907 - 1912: Benalla Wednesday (Half Holiday) Football Association
- 1913 - Merged with Benalla & Railway United FC & reformed as Benalla Football Club

Benalla & Railway United Football Club (1911 & 1912)

- 1911 & 1912: Benalla Wednesday (Half Holiday) Football Association
- 1913 - Merged with Benalla Gymnasium FC & reformed as Benalla Football Club

Benalla Rovers Football Club

- 1920 - 1923: North East (Euroa) Football Association
- 1922 - 1928: Yarrawonga Line Football Association
- 1929 & 1930: Ovens & Murray Football League
- 1931 - Changed its name to Benalla Football Club
- 1976 - 1989: Benalla & District Football League

Benalla Juniors Football Club

- 1929 - 1931: Benalla & District Football League
- 1932 - Changed their name to the Benalla Imperials FC and joined the Euroa Line Football Association.

Benalla Imperials Football Club

- 1932 & 1933: Euroa District Football Association
- 1934 - Benalla Imperials merged with the Benalla Football Club.

== Football premierships ==
Benalla Football Club
Seniors

This is a complete list of premierships won by the club in the different leagues where it played:

League	Total flags	Premiership year(s)	Runner up
North Eastern Football Association	3	1895, 1896, 1897	
Brigg's Challenge Cup / Wednesday FA	1	1904 (Benalla A)	
Moira Football Association	2	1904, 1905	1903
Benalla Yarrawonga Line Football Association	2	1909, 1920	1921
Euroa District Football Association	3	1931 1932, 1933	
Benalla Mulwala Football League	1	1935	1936, 1937
Benalla Tungamah Football League	1	1939*	1938
Goulburn Valley Football League	2	1940, 2015	2006, 2014
Benalla Patriotic Football League	1	1941	
Ovens and Murray Football League	4	1953, 1962, 1963, 1973	1947, 1954, 1961, 1978

- 1939 - Benalla were undefeated premiers.

Reserves

League	Total flags	Premiership year(s)	Runner up
Brigg's Challenge Cup / Wednesday FA	0		1904 (Benalla B)
Benalla Mulwala Line Football Association	0		1930, 1931
Benalla & District Football League	1	1946	
Benalla Tungamah Football League	2	1950, 1952	1948, 1949
Ovens and Murray Football League	3	1955, 1972, 1978	1959, 1962, 1971, 1974, 1982
Goulburn Valley Football League	1	2003	

Thirds

League	Total flags	Premiership year(s)	Runner up
Benalla & District Football League	0		1949
Ovens and Murray Football League	2	1974, 1997	1973, 1976, 1981, 1996
Goulburn Valley Football League	4	1998, 2004, 2014,	2015

Benalla Gymnasium Football Club

League	Total flags	Premiership year(s)	Runner up
Benalla Wednesday Football Association	3	1908, 1910, 1912	

Benalla Rovers Football Club
Seniors

League	Total flags	Premiership year(s)	Runner up
North Eastern Line Football Association	2	1920, 1921	
Yarrawonga Line Football Association	2	1923, 1928	1922, 1927, 1930
Benalla & District Football League	1	1986	

Benalla Junior Football Club

League	Total flags	Premiership year(s)	Runner up
Benalla District Football League	2	1930, 1931	1929

== Netball premierships ==
Ovens and Murray Football / Netball League: 1993 to 1997

- No premierships

Goulburn Valley Football Netball League: 1998 to present day

A. Grade

- 1998, 1999, 2000, 2001, 2003, 2004, 2007

B. Reserve

- 2001

17 and Under

- 2008

== Ovens and Murray Football League: Best & Fairest winners ==
The list includes the following players:

Seniors – Morris Medal

- 1954 – Kevin Hurley
- 1968 – John Waddington
- 1990 – Jamie Ronke. Father of Ben Ronke – Sydney Swans.

Reserves – Ralph Marks Medal

- 1960 – Roy Symes
- 1968 – Norm Hogan
- 1973 – Graham Sherwill

Thirds - 3NE Award

- 1973 – Peter Nolan
- 1976 – John Martiniello. (Martiniello also won the 1993 Tungamah Football League senior football, Lawless Medal, with the Benalla All Blacks Football Club.)
- 1983 – Rod Brewster

== Goulburn Valley Football League – Best & Fairest winners ==
The list includes the following players:

Seniors – Morrison Medal

- 1999 – Anthony Pasquali. Father of Seb Pasquali – Western United
- 2008 – Rowan Priest
- 2013 – Luke Morgan
- 2014 – William Martiniello
- 2018 - Sam Martyn

Reserves – Abikhair Medal

- 1998 – P Warnock
- 2007 – Chris Dube
- 2011 – Chris Dube. (Chris Dube also won the 2018 Ovens & King Football League senior football Baker Medal with Greta Football Club.)

Thirds – Pattison Medal

- 2002 – R Joyce

== Hall of Fame inductees ==
Ovens & Murray Football League

- 2008 - Neil Hanlon
- 2010 - Emmy DeFazio
- 2012 - John Brunner
- 2013 - John Martiniello

== Senior football stats ==
- Most games
  - 316 - John Martiniello
  - 251 - Emmy DeFazio
  - 247 - Robbie Allan
  - 247 - Bernie Squires
  - 225 - Terry Greaves
  - 209 - Neil Hanlon
  - 196 - Bill Sammon
  - 100 + - Edward "Ted" Briggs
  - 100 + - Roy Symes
- Most goals in a match
  - 16 - Ricky Symes - 2005 - GVFL Rd.12: Benalla v Tatura
  - 13 - Vern Drake - 1972. O&MFL
  - 12 - Fred Beeson - 1923. O&MFL Rd.2 - Benalla v Lake Rovers
  - 12 - Reg Roscoe - 1953. O&MFL Rd.17 - Benalla v Yarrawonga
  - 12 - Norm Minns - 1954. O&MFL Rd.14: Benalla v Corowa.
  - 11 - Wheeler. 9 July 1928. O&MFL: Benalla v Beechworth.
  - 11 - Bob Chitty - 1947 - O&MFL Rd.13: Benalla v Rutherglen.
  - 11 - Josh Mellington. 5 September 2015 - GVFNL: Benalla v Euroa.

== VFL / AFL players ==
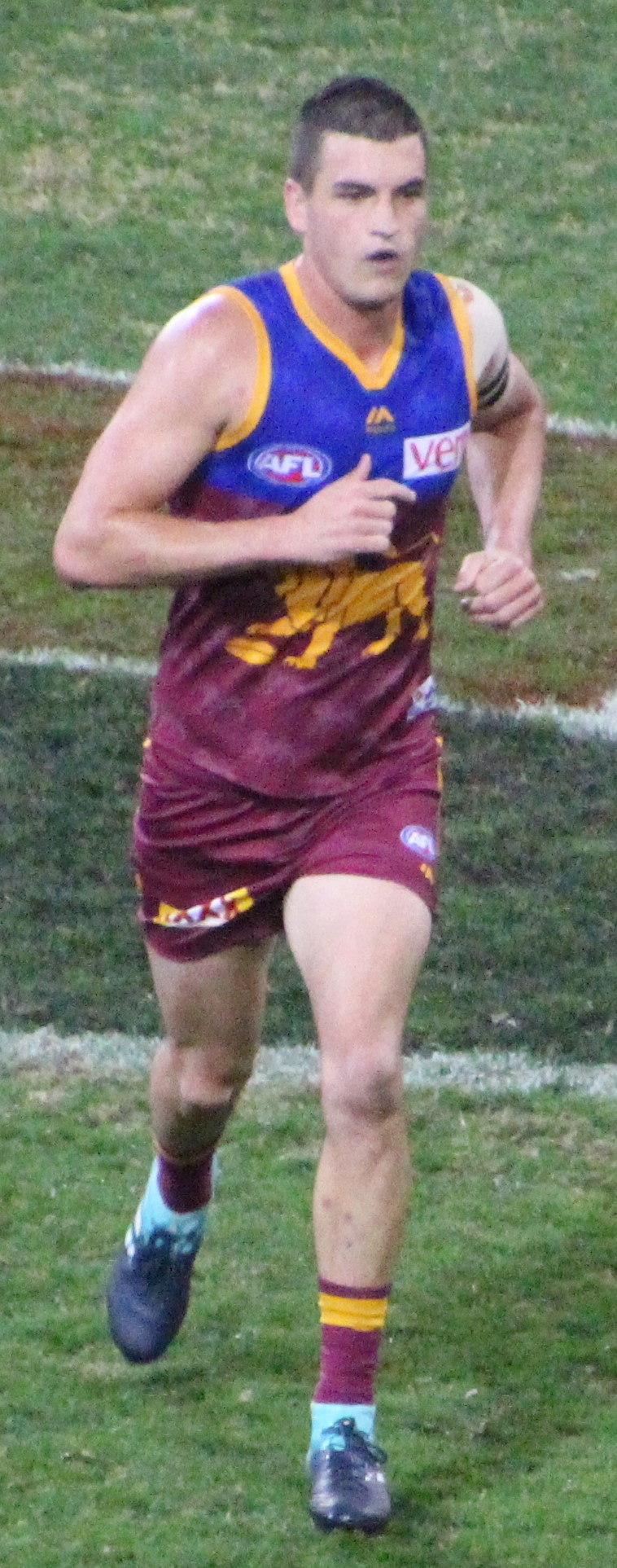
Tom Rockliff Lions V's Suns 2017

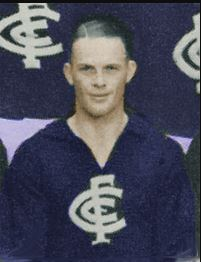
Bob Chitty early 1940s

The following 38 players played with Benalla, prior to playing senior football in the VFL/AFL, and / or drafted, with the year indicating their VFL/AFL debut.

- 1897 – Jim Flynn – Geelong & Carlton
- 1905 – Dave McNamara – St. Kilda
- 1906 – Cec Garton – Essendon
- 1906 – Andy Kennedy – Carlton & Melbourne
- 1907 – John Gilding – St. Kilda
- 1909 – Tom McEwan – Carlton
- 1924 – Fred Beeson – Fitzroy
- 1925 – Clarrie Nolan – North Melbourne
- 1927 - Dinny Kelleher - Carlton & South Melbourne
- 1928 - Doug Ringrose - Fitzroy
- 1935 – Jack Bridgfoot – Footscray
- 1936 – Arthur Hall – Fitzroy
- 1944 – Bryan Crimmins – Melbourne
- 1948 – Max Howell – Carlton
- 1952 – Kevin Bond – Hawthorn
- 1952 – John Brady – North Melbourne
- 1953 – Kevin Gleeson – Richmond
- 1954 - Kevin Hogan - South Melbourne
- 1956 - Ray Lalor - Essendon
- 1958 – Barry Connolly – Footscray
- 1958 – John Stephenson – Carlton
- 1958 – Frank Hogan – South Melbourne
- 1959 – John Thompson – Richmond
- 1964 – Neil Busse – Richmond & South Melbourne
- 1968 – Kevin Sykes – North Melbourne
- 1971 – Gary Cowton – Nth Melbourne, Footscray & Sth Melbourne
- 1972 – Brian Symes – North Melbourne
- 1973 - Michael Stilo - North Melbourne
- 1976 – Chris Elliott – South Melbourne
- 1985 – Steven Hickey – North Melbourne
- 1990 - Andrew Harrison - Brisbane Lions. No AFL games. No 15 in 1990 AFL National Draft.
- 1990 - Tim Symes - Sydney Swans. No AFL games. No 29 in 1990 Mid season AFL draft
- 1998 – Ricky Symes – Western Bulldogs. No AFL games. No.61 in 1998 AFL Draft.
- 2001 – Matthew Shir – Adelaide Crows
- 2003 – Jarrad Waite – Carlton & North Melbourne
- 2009 – Tom Rockliff – Brisbane, Port Adelaide
- 2011 – Josh Mellington – Fremantle
- 2015 - Caleb Marchbank - Greater Western Sydney
- 2017 – Harry Morrison – Hawthorn

The following footballers played senior VFL / AFL football prior to making their debut with the Benalla FC. The year indicates their debut season at Benalla.

- 1923 - Tom Drummond
- 1925 - Les Bryant
- 1925 - Bob Merrick
- 1926 - Jim Morden
- 1926 - Wal Matthews
- 1927 - Bert Lenne
- 1946 - Terry Boyle
- 1947 - Bob Chitty
- 1950 - Ken Walker
- 1956 - Len Fitzgerald
- 1958 - Bob Hempel
- 1960 - Les Reed
- 1964 - Graeme Jonson
- 1966 - John Waddington
- 1970 - Vern Drake
- 1975 - Terry Leahy
- 1980? - Robin Close
- 1982 - Len Halley
- 1984 - Wayne Primmer
- 1988 - Phil Carman
- 1990 - Mark Perkins
- 1993 - Andrew Dale
- 2005 - Anthony Stevens
- 2006 - Mark Porter
- 2008 - Michael Stevens
- 2011 - Richard Ambrose

== Life members ==
- 1927 - J Skelton (Life Patron)
- 1933 - Thomas A Moore
- 1948 - Jack Talochino
- 1950 - Mrs. A W Roscoe
- 1953 - Mr. A W Roscoe

All other club life members can be viewed via the club's official website.

== Club honourboard ==
Senior Football

Year	President	Secretary	Treasurer	Captain	Coach	Best & Fairest	Top Goalkicker	Goals	Position/Wins/Losses
1871		J P Hayes							
1878	D C O'Leary	Jamieson	Kitson						
1881				Gregory					
1882	D C O'Leary								
1883	D C O'Leary			E N Moore					
1884	D C O'Leary	J C Sadleir	C S Carr	Lamrock			J C Sadleir	6	
1885	D C O'Leary	J C Sadleir	C S Carr	Lamrock					
1886									
1887									
1888									
1889		A S Maude							
1890				Chadwick					
1890				Harper					
1891									
1892	D Roe	A S Maude							3rd
1893	D Roe	A S Maude							
1894		A S Maude		Soderstrom					
1895	Evan James	A S Maude	R T Barron						1st
1896	C Turnbull	H Clarke	A S Maude						1st
1897									1st
1898									
1899	Chas Cunningham	John Shanahan							
1901-02									club in recess
1903		Joseph Williams							
1904	A S Gerrand	Joseph Williams	G Jordan Jnr	J Headland		J Headland &			
						A Brown			
1905	A S Gerrand	A C Brown	G Jordan Jnr						
1906	W Mackerill	A C Brown	G Williams						
1907	W Mackerill	A C Brown	A C Brown						
1908	George Mowbray	A C Brown &							
		R Hunt							
1909	A Gregerson	A C Brown	R Hunt						
1910	E F S England	A S Maude &	A S Maude &						
		H M Blackburne	H M Blackburne			P Williams			
1911-12									club in recess
1913	Kenny	S P Morris	Triado						
1914	J W Meadows	S P Morris	Joseph Murphy						
1915	C D Laird	A Wann	G Noonan						
1916-18									in recess WW1
1919	J McNamara	A E Handley &			Bartholomew				
		R P Lewers							
1920	Dr. Thwaites	J W Doherty &	J W Doherty	L Hill		A Boyd			
		P Sutherland							
1921	Dr. McArdel	C Forster							
1922	Dr. W N Davies	C Forster	V Little		Doug Ringrose				4th:O&MFL 4 wins/4 losses/2 draws
1923	Dr. W N Davies	C Forster		Tom Drummond	Tom Drummond		Fred Beeson	66	3rd 9/5/1
1924	Dr. W N Davies	B Peacock	J D McKenzie	Tom Drummond	Tom Drummond		Les Hill	38	6th 6 / 8
1925	G A V Home	B Peacock	R I Bourke	Les Hill	Bob Merrick				5th 7/7
1926	G A V Home	B Peacock	W Bower	Jim Morden	Jim Morden &				4th 7/8
				Wal Matthews	Wal Matthews				
1927	T V Cowan	H Sullivan	L W Wilkinson	Doherty	Bert Lenne				4th 8/7
1927		L W Wilkinson	M Forrest						
1928	T V Cowan	H Sullivan	L W Wilkinson	Jack Huggard	J Huggard	Herb Howell			7th: 3/11
				Leo K Woods	Leo K Woods				
		L W Wilkinson	M Forrest						
1929	T V Cowan	M Forrest	L W Wilkinson	Herb Howell	?				5th 7/5/2
1930	Tim V Egan	C Mackerell	O'Brien	P Bolman					7th 5/9
1931	Tim V Egan	Len Fawcett	Stan Jackson			Bernie Squires			1st - Euroa DFA
		J Loh				Dave Smith			1st: Yarra Line FA
1932	Tim V Egan	M Forrest &	Tom Moore	Tom Drummond	Tom Drummond				1st: Euroa DFA
		Lance C Neill							
1933	Tim V Egan		C R Brunton			Dave Smith			1st: EDFA
1934	Tim V Egan	J Quirk	C R Brunton						4th: EDFA
1935	Tim V Egan	C Peck	W Howitt	Bernie Squires	Jack Bradshaw	George McLean			1st: BMFL
1936	Tim P Egan	J O'Regan	A Grant		Jack Bradshaw	George McLean			2nd: BMFL
1937	Tim P Egan			Bernie Squires		W Hicks			2nd:BMFL
1938	Tim P Egan	S O'Brien	S O'Brien	W Hicks/G McLean					2nd:TBFL
1939	Alf W Roscoe	C A Pinkstone	C A Pinkstone	Bernie Squires	Andy Donaldson	R Dosser			1st:TBFL
1940	Alf W Roscoe	Les Lee	J Cochineas	Jack Budd		Will Bamblett			1st:GVFL
	Jack Talochino	S A Pinkstone	J Cochineas						
1941									1st:Benalla PFL
1942-4									In recess:WW2
1945									Benalla PFL
1946	Jack Talochino	W Elliott	W Hunt	Ern Guppy	Greg Humphrey &	Barry Talochino	Jack Budd	44*	4th: O&MFL: 6 wins/7 losses/2 byes
				Joe Askew	Joe Askew				
1947	Jack Talochino	Jim Spencer	W Hunt	Bob Chitty	Bob Chitty	Barry Talochino	Bob Chitty	86*#	2nd: 11/6
1948	Cr Jack Moore	B Boyd &	George R McCartney	Bob Chitty	Bob Chitty	Barry Talochino	Bob Chitty	49	4th: 9/6
		Jim Spencer							
1949	Alf W Roscoe	Alan Brock &	George R McCartney	Bob Chitty	Bob Chitty	Ross Lighton	Bob Chitty	68#	7th: 2/12
		Jim Spencer							
1950	Alf W Roscoe	Alan Brock	George R McCartney	Ken Walker	Ken Walker	Bill Pinder	Ken Walker	55	5th: 9/8/1 draw
1951	Roy Hill	Alan Brock &	Roy Hodder	Ken Walker	Ken Walker	Jack Andrews	Kevin Gleeson	61	8th: 5/13
		J D Bacon							
1952	Roy Hill	J D Bacon	Roy Hodder	Reg Featherby	Reg Featherby	Reg Featherby	Kevin Hurley	46	7th: 6/12
1953	Roy Hill	Sol Cocks	Roy Hodder	Norm Minns	Norm Minns	Jack Spriggs	Reg Roscoe	53*	1st
1954	Roy Hill	Sol Cocks	Roy Hodder	Norm Minns	Norm Minns	Jack Spriggs	Norm Minns	71+	2nd: 14/6 Runner Up
1955	Glen Stewart			Norm Minns	Norm Minns	Roy Symes			9th
1956					Len Fitzgerald				3rd: 12/6
1957					Len Fitzgerald	Neil Hanlon			1st: 15/3
1958					Len Fitzgerald	Neil Hanlon			
1959						Neil Hanlon			
1960					Vin Williams	Richie Castles			5th: 10/8
1961					Vin Williams	Terry Putt			2nd: 13/5. Runner Up
1962					Vin Williams	Neil Hanlon	Ian Hughes	55	2nd: 13/5. 1st Premiers
1963					Vin Williams	Neil Langlands			1st Premiers
1964						Neil Hanlon			9th: 4/13/1
1965					Graeme Jonson	Graeme Trewin			10th: 4/14
1966					Graeme Jonson	Graeme Lessing			8th: 6/12
1967					John Waddington	Kevin Sykes	Rod McNab	40	5th: 10/7/1
1968						Peter Roscoe			8th: 9/9
1969						Bill Sammon			8th: 6/12
1970					Vern Drake	Bill Sammon	Vern Drake	52	6th: 7/11
1971					Vern Drake	Emmy DeFazio	Vern Drake	87	2nd: 14/4
1972					Vern Drake	Emmy DeFazio	Vern Drake	120*#	2nd: 15/3
1973					Ken Roberts	Emmy DeFazio			1st: 15/3
1974						Gary Levy	Gary Levy	49	4th: 13/5
1975					Terry Leahy	Emmy DeFazio			4th: 11/7
1976					Brian Symes	Emmy DeFazio			7th: 8/9/1 draw
1977					Bill Sammon	Emmy DeFazio			7th: 7/10/1
1978					Bill Sammon	Robert Johnston			1st: 15/3. Runners Up
1979					Brian Symes				9th: 5/13
1980	Cliff Barnes	John Ronke	Kevin Brennan	Brian Symes	Bill Sykes	Brian Symes			10th: 3/15
1981					Robin Close	Don V Robertson			8th: 6/12
1982					Robin Close	John Martiniello			6th: 11/7
1983					Mick Stilo	Steven Lalor			6th: 9/9
1984				Wayne Primmer	Wayne Primmer	John Martiniello			7th: 8/9/1
1985				Wayne Primmer	Wayne Primmer	Terry Greaves			3rd: 12/5/1
1986				John Martiniello	Peter Mangles	Wayne Primmer			10th: 4/14
1987				Wayne Primmer	Wayne Primmer				9th: 5/13
1988	Peter Mangles				Phil Carman	John Martiniello			9th: 5/13
1989					Rick Martin	Wayne Primmer			8th: 5/15
1990	Malcom Kego	John Ronke	Kevin Brennan	Wayne Primmer	Wayne Ling				5th: 12/8
1991				Wayne Primmer	Wayne Ling		Tim Symes	48?	3rd: 13/7
1992				John Dore		John Martiniello			9th: 6/14
1993				Andrew Dale	Andrew Dale				9th: 4/16
1994				Andrew Dale	Andrew Dale	John Martiniello			8th: 4/13
1995				Glen Carroll	Glen Carroll	John Brunner			11th: 0/18
1996				Paul Taylor	Glen Carroll	Fraser Stevenson			10th: 1/17
1997					Steve Hickey	John Martiniello			
1998					Steven Hickey	Fraser Stevenson			Joined the GVFNL
1999					Anthony Pasquali	Anthony Pasquali			
2000					Anthony Pasquali				
2001					Brenton Cooper	Daniel Maher			
2002					Brenton Cooper	Richard Bull	Brenton Cooper	90#	
2003	Geoff Cooper				Peter Sheehan	Daniel Maher			
2004					Peter Sheehan				
2005							Ricky Sykes	103#	
2006					Jason McFarlane				2nd:
2007					Jason McFarlane				10th: 6/12
2008					Tim Symes				10th:6/12
2009					Tim Symes				12th 1/17
2010	Graham Pollard				Tim Symes	Matt Sharp	Ricky Symes	56	10th: 4/14
2011	Ron Cook				Tim Symes		Ricky Symes	56	8th: 8/10
2012					Tim Symes	Alister Jacka	Alister Jacka	30	12th: 2/16
2013					Luke Morgan	Luke Morgan	Nick Warnock	41	4th: 14/5/1
2014	Bruce Briggs				Luke Morgan	Willy Martiniello	Nick Warnock	67	2nd: 20/1
2015				Jimmy Martiniello	Luke Morgan	Willy Martiniello	Josh Mellington	111*#	1st: 17/5
2016	Graham Pollard				Luke Morgan	Zach Pallpratt	Nick Warnock	64	3rd: 13/7/1
2017					Luke Morgan	Brody Webster	Jarrod Bannister	54	6th: 11/8
2018	Lloyd Johnson				Luke Morgan	Sam Martyn	Nick Warnock	67	3rd: 13/6
2019	Lloyd Johnson				Jimmy Martinello	Willy Martiniello	Brody Webster	45	7th: 9 / 9
2020	Lloyd Johnson				Jake Pallpratt				GVFNL in recess > COVID-19 pandemic
2021	Lloyd Johnson				Jake Pallpratt	Callum Crisp	Nick Warnock	23	7th: 5 wins / 6 losses. No finals> COVID-19 pandemic
2022	Lloyd Johnson				Mark McKenzie & Will Martinello	Nick Welsh	Jarrad Waite	19	10th: 3 / 15
2023	Geoff Hill				Mark McKenzie & Will Martinello	Jordan Wolff	Jarrad Waite	27	12th: 3/15
2024					Jarrad Waite	Mark Marriot	Wade King	21	10th: 4/13/1
2025					Jarrad Waite	Mark Marriot	Nathan Wright	64	9th: 4/14
2026					Nick Pearson		Michael Mummery	38	11th: 4/14
Year	President	Secretary	Treasurer	Captain	Coach	Best & Fairest	Top Goalkicker	Goals	Position

- - * includes goals kicked in finals
- - Ladder position is at the end of the home & away series of matches.
