= Waddington (surname) =

Waddington is an Old English surname of Anglo-Saxon English origin. It is thought to derive from the Old English pre-7th century personal name "Wada", plus "-ing", meaning the tribe or people of", and "tun or ham", a settlement; and hence, "The settlement of the Wada people". It may be connected to be connected with the pre-7th century Old English name "Wade", and the verb "wadan" (wada) meaning "to go", or as a habitational name from the Old English word "(ge)waed" meaning "ford".

== Origins and variants ==
Wadington, Waddington, Wodington, Wadiham, Wadyngton, and Waddingham, this is an English locational surname, derived from the Olde English name Wadingtun or Wadingatun. It originates from any or all of the villages called Waddington in Lincolnshire and the West Riding of Yorkshire, and Waddiham in Lincoln. Waditun (Waddington) an ancient hamlet at Craven in Yorkshire (quoted in Domesday Book 1086 as Widitun). When Surnames were first adopted, some 1,000 years ago, it was in or near this Hamlet or Village that the ancestors of all those who now bear its name (Waddington) resided and are of the Divine Stock of Woden." The surname Waddington was first found in Yorkshire where they were Lords of the manor of Waddington, a village and parish near Clitheroe. "It is natural to find the name crossing the border into Lancashire. This surname has ramified very strongly in the Northern counties." Indeed, another source claims the family did in fact originate in Lancashire: "The Waddingtons, who are also established in Lancashire, have their principal home in the West Riding, where occur a village and a seat of the name." The Canterbury Journal states : "The Waddingtons are, we have heard, of Saxon origin, being like the "Guelphs" lineal descendants from the renowned "Woden" (70 B.c.) as also from the Ferrands of Gas-cony, a house which in the 12th century gave Kings to Portugal."

== Wada Dux ==
The Ancient clan chief Odin (b. circa 210), Woutan or Woden, was treated like a God by the Northern Races. The Historical Odin was chief of the Æsir Tribe, who were based in Sweden. His sons became the Kings of Norway, Sweden, Denmark and Germany. Descendant of Odin (Wodin/Waegdaeg/Wihtlaeg/Witta/Wihtgils/Hengest/Hartwake/Hattwigate/Hulderic/Bodic/Bertold/Sighard/Dieteric/Wernicke) was Wada Dux; an Anglo Saxon Chief of Lancashire and Yorkshire, and founder of the Township of Waddington and from whom the name of Waddington is derived. The name signified the town (ton) of the children (ing) of Wada. Wada's father was said to be King Wernicke (sometimes written as Warnechin, Warnikind, Vellikinus), 10th King of Saxony. His brother is said to be the famous clan leader Wudikind, who fought Charlemagne. Eardwulf of Northumbria fought a battle at Billington Moor against a nobleman named Wada in 798, who had been one of those who killed King Æthelred I of Northumbria. The Waddington name may be traced in such places as "Wad-how, Wadsworth, Paddington, and strange as it may seem, in Padiham, the abode of Wada, since Pada and Wada were only variations of the same word. Their possessions extended over a large part of Yorkshire and Lancashire",

In 798 Wada Dux and his wife Bell had issue son called Wade (Wada). The principal seat of the Waddingtons was at Waddington, near Clitheroe. Chief of the region circa 1187 was Walter Wadingaton and his wife Goda. Their son, also named Walter, had several children including Alice; who would go on to marry Sir Roger Tempest of Bracewell. Lands belonging to, or leased from land owners or the King by the Waddington family included Slaidburn, Bolton-by-Boland, Downham, Rimmington, Barshall Eaves, Chaigley, Edisford, Read, Padham, Altham, Clayton-le-Moors, Rishton, Accrington, Haslingden and Hoddlesden.

An English branch of this family passed to Portugal in the first decade of the 19th century in the person of George August Henry then Jorge Augusto Henrique Waddington, born in 1776, son of George Waddington and wife Isabel, all native of London, Middlesex, Colonel of the British Army who came to Portugal in 1808 with the British troops commanded by William Carr Beresford. He took part in the campaign of the Peninsular War being then Aide-de-Camp of the Duke of Wellington, as a Lieutenant of the British Army Regiment of Infantry Nr. 38, entered in the Battle of Roliça on 17 and in the Battle of Vimeiro on 21 August 1808, and was the first British Officer to be promoted to Captain, on 25 March 1809, of the 1st Company of Grenadiers of the Portuguese Army Regiment of Infantry Nr. 4, where he served and distinguished himself at the Battle of Bussaco on 27 September 1810, the Battle of los Santos on 15 April 1811, the Second Siege of Badajoz on 6 and 13 May 1811 and the Battle of Albuera on 16 May 1811. He was baptized at Santiago Maior, Castelo de Vide, and married there at Santa Maria da Devesa to Laureana Cândida Crato, born there, who lived at the Rua do Barão, 41 - 1st floor, in Alfama, São João da Praça, Lisbon, and died of a fulminant apoplexy aged 84 at the Rua do Poço dos Negros, 142 - 1st floor, Santos-o-Velho, Lisbon, at 3h00mPM of 18 December 1869 and was buried in a plot coffin at the Prazeres Cemetery, Prazeres, Lisbon, by whom he had issue, now extinct in male line. It is tradition that this family issued from Wada (Wada Dux), who lived in the 7th century, being descendant of Odin, Chief of Æsir, from Asia Minor, who, harassed by the Romans, emigrated to Europe in the year 70 BC. Wada, Anglo-Saxon Chief of Lancashire and Yorkshire, was the founder of the city of Waddington, the city of the sons of Wada, and one of the members of the plot against King Eardwulf of Northumbria, which ended by the defeat of the conspirators at the Battle of Billington, near Whalley, Lancashire, on 2 April 798. He had, by his wife Bell, issue, among whom Wade (Wada), who gave origin to the family. The main residence of the Waddingtons was in Waddington, near Clitheroe, house in which in 1464 King Henry VI of England was refuged, after defeated at the Battle of Hexham. Waddington Hall, currently still in possession of a branch of the family, was restored in 1900 by John Waddington and today belongs to his heirs. The arms of this Waddington family, as they are carved at Waddington Hall, are: broken argent and gules, fess of one into the other, accompanied in chief by two fleurs-de-lis and in point of one ax of arms, also of one into the other; crest: a naked arm curved proper, holding in the hand a spear and an ax of arms, passed in saltire, the hand finished by a fleur-de-lis gules; they bring as motto: PRO RECTO SEMPER. In these arms there is unknowing of some enamels and doubt on others.

== Notable Waddingtons of Waddington ==
- Walter de Wadyngton (1217–1293), married Goda, son (Walter) had a daughter Alice (Tempest)
- Thomas de Wadyngton, appointment (1348) by Sir John Tempest Knight as Lord of the Village of Wadyngton
- Walter de Wadyngton (1340–1356), fought at the Battle of Poitiers
- Thomas de Wadyngton (1350–1400), went to Ireland on the King's service in the company with John de Stanley, supplying Robert, Marquis of Dublin
- Robert Waddington (1415–1480), inherited Hoddlesden, New Hay (near Hoddlesden) Hacking, Grimshaw, and Oakenshaw (Clayton-le-Moores); which was assured by the payment of £20 by Geoffrey Grimshaw (presumed his brother-in-law)
- Thomas Waddington (1450–1530), married Alice Towneley of Towneley Hall. Held estates in Rishton, Burnley, Worston, Edisforth, Extwistle, Broad Holden (Haslingden) and Simonstone. In 1517 he transferred the lands Scaytcliff (Scaitcliffe) and Peneworth (Accrington) to Nicholas Rishton and to his Son Geoffrey.
- Reynold Waddington (1485–1543), Greave of Haslingden and Ightenhill
- Henry Waddington (1490–1550), in 1509 vs Vicar Henry Salley; over Estate of Hakking (in Blackburn); was given Lands in Rodland and Typynhill in Hightenhill. Ightenhill spans the River Calder to the north of Padiham and includes Gawthorpe Hall
- Thomas Waddington (1493–1591), (in 1549) elected Greave for Clitheroe,

== Notable people and fictional characters with the surname ==
- Abe Waddington (1893–1959), English cricketer
- Alfred Waddington (1801–72), colonial entrepreneur in British Columbia, Canada
- Andrucha Waddington (born 1970), Brazilian film director
- Bill Waddington (1916–2000), British actor
- Charles Waddington (disambiguation), various people of this name:
  - Charles Waddington (East India Company officer) (1796–1858), major-general Bombay engineers
  - Charles Waddington (philosopher) (1819–1914), French philosopher and writer
- Conrad Hal Waddington (1905–75), British biologist who developed the theory of epigenetics
- Charlotte Mary Waddington (1907–2002), British journalist wrote as Mary Stott
- David Waddington (Essex) (fl. 1840s–1850s), Member of Parliament (MP) for Maldon 1847–52 and for Harwich 1852–56
- David Waddington, Baron Waddington (1929–2017), English Conservative Party politician, Home Secretary 1989–90
- Edward Waddington (1670 or 1671 – 1731), bishop of Chichester, England
- George Waddington (1793–1869), English traveller and church historian
- John Waddington (disambiguation), various people of this name:
  - John Waddington (cleric) (1810–80), English congregational cleric
  - John Waddington (cricketer, born 1918) (1918–85), South African cricketer
  - John Waddington (Australian rules footballer) (1938–2019), Australian rules footballer
  - John Waddington Limited, card and board game company named for one of its founders
- Mary Alsop King Waddington (1833–1923), American author
- Melville Waddington (1895–1945), Canadian soldier
- Michael Waddington (born 1974), American military criminal defense attorney
- Miriam Waddington (1917–2004), Canadian poet
- Patricia Waddington (Fothergill, previously Ambler), Scottish roboticist
- Patrick Waddington (1903–87), British actor
- Paul Waddington (1893–1986), World War I flying ace
- Peter Waddington (1947–2018), British sociologist and police officer
- Peter Waddington (rower) (1937–2022), Australian rower
- Tad Waddington (born 1962), American author and statistician
- Sheila Waddington (née Sheila Willcox; 1936–2017), the first woman equestrian in the UK to achieve international success
- Steve Waddington, an English footballer
- Steven Waddington, an English film and television actor
- Sue Waddington (born 1944), British politician
- Tony Waddington (songwriter) (born 1943), English singer-songwriter, record producer, film producer, screenplay writer, and creative media executive
- William of Waddington (fl. 13th c), Anglo-Norman writer
- William Henry Waddington (1826–94), Prime Minister of France

== See also ==
- Waddington (disambiguation), for other uses
- Waddingtons, card and board game company named for one of its founders
- Wadding (surname)
