= Garton (surname) =

Garton is a surname. Notable people with this surname include:

- Abraham Garton, Spanish printer
- Adam Garton (born 1962), Australian rules footballer
- Alan Garton (1922–2010), British biochemist
- Andrew Garton (born 1962), Australian filmmaker and musician
- Billy Garton (born 1965), British footballer
- Brad Garton (born 1957), American composer and musician
- Cec Garton (1874–1908), Australian rules footballer
- Elizabeth Garton Scanlon, American author
- Gaby Garton (born 1990), American-Argentine footballer
- George Garton (born 1997), English cricketer
- Henry Garton (1600–1641), English politician
- James Garton (born 1887), English footballer
- Jim Garton (born 1901), British electrical engineer and activist
- John Garton (1941–2016), British bishop and theologian
- John Garton, British politician
- Johnny Garton (born 1987), English boxer
- Rachel Garton (born 1991), Ghanaian singer known professionally as Lola Rae
- Ray Garton (1962–2024), American author
- Robert D. Garton (1933–2026), American politician
- Ryan Garton (born 1989), American baseball player
- Stanley Garton (1889–1948), British rower
- Troy Garton (born 1988), New Zealand boxer
