= Ringrose =

Ringrose may refer to:

- Basil Ringrose (about 1653–1683), English buccaneer
- Bert Ringrose (1916–1968), English footballer
- Billy Ringrose (1930–2020), Irish equestrian
- Doug Ringrose (1900–1953), Australian rules footballer
- Garry Ringrose (born 1995), Irish rugby union player
- Hedley Ringrose (1942–2021), British Anglican priest
- John Robert Ringrose (born 1932), mathematician
- William Ringrose (1871–1943), English cricketer
