= John Waddington =

John Waddington may refer to:

- John Waddington (minister) (1810–1880), English congregational cleric
- John Waddington (colonial administrator) (1890–1957), English colonial administrator, Governor of Barbados and of Northern Rhodesia
- John Waddington (priest) (1910–1994), Anglican Provost of St Edmundsbury
- John Waddington (South African cricketer) (1918–1985), South African cricketer, played for Griqualand West 1934–59
- John Waddington (Essex cricketer) (1910–1995), English cricketer, played for Essex in 1931
- John Waddington (Australian rules footballer) (born 1938), Australian rules footballer
- John Waddington (English footballer) (born 1952), English footballer who played for Blackburn Rovers
- John Waddington (musician), British guitarist, formerly of The Pop Group
- John Waddington Limited, card and board game company
- John A. Waddington, New Jersey politician
