= Wadding (disambiguation) =

Wadding is a disc of material used in guns to seal gas behind a projectile or to separate powder from shot.

Wadding may also refer to:

- Wadding (surname)
- Batting (material), a layer of insulation used in quilting

== See also ==
- Wad (disambiguation)
- Waddington (disambiguation)
