= Christopher Elliott =

Christopher, Christine, or Chris Elliott, or variants, may refer to:

== Military ==
- Christopher Haslett Elliott (born 1947), British Army officer (South Wales Borderers, Royal Regiment of Wales)
- Christopher Leslie Elliott (born 1947), British Army officer (Royal Engineers)
- Chris Elliot (Christina Reid Elliot, fl. 1985–2020), British Royal Air Force air vice marshal

== Sports ==
- Chris Elliott (footballer) (born 1953), Australian rules footballer
- Christy Elliott (1951–2011), Irish boxer
- Christy Elliot (1933–2020), Scottish rugby footballer
- Christie Elliott (born 1991), English footballer

== Other ==
- Chris Elliott (Christopher Nash Elliott, born 1960), American comedian and actor
- Chris Elliott (food scientist) (Christopher Elliott, fl. 2000s–2020s), professor of food security at Queen's University Belfast
- Chris Elliott (politician) (Thomas Christopher Elliott, born 1980), American politician in Alabama

== See also ==
- Christian Elliott (born 1997), American sport shooter
- Christine Elliott (born 1955), Canadian lawyer and politician
