= Max Howell =

Max Howell may refer to:

- Max Howell (footballer), Australian rules footballer
- Max Howell (educator), Australian educator and rugby union player
- Max Howell (politician), American lawyer and politician in Arkansas
