= Stephen Hickey =

Stephen Hickey may refer to:

- Stephen Hickey (diplomat), British diplomat
- Steve Hickey (footballer) (born 1965), Australian rules footballer
