= Gilding (surname) =

Gilding is a surname. Notable people with the surname include:

- Andrew Gilding (born 1970), English darts player
- Jack Gilding (born 1988), English rugby union player
- John Gilding (1884–1969), Australian rules footballer
- Lincoln Gilding (born 1992), Australian motorcycle racer
- Paul Gilding, Australian environmentalist, consultant and writer
