= Sam Lalor =

Australian rules footballer (born 2006)

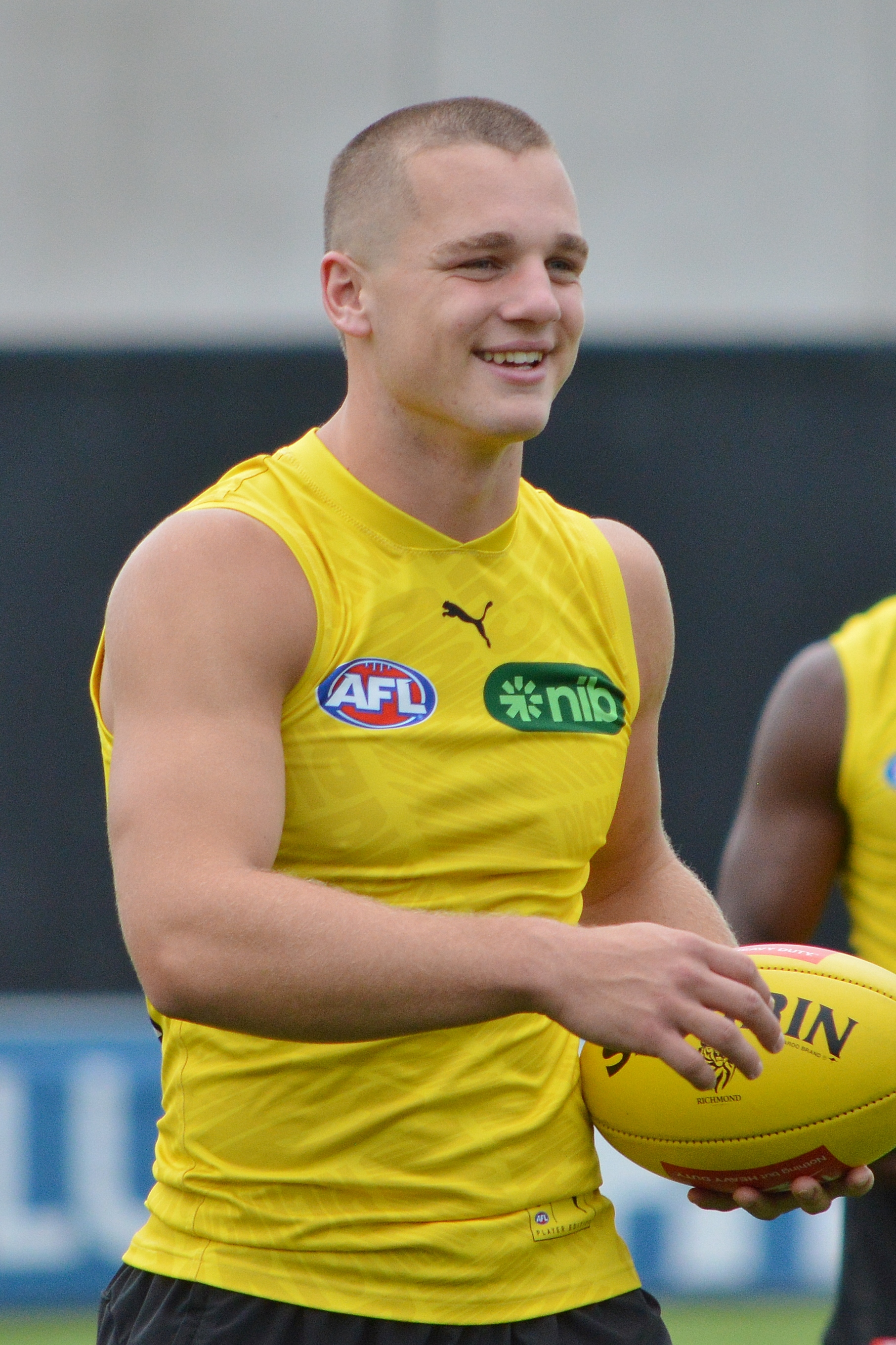
- Lalor in March 2026

Personal information
- Full name: Samuel Lalor
- Born: 30 August 2006 (age 20)
- Original teams: Bacchus Marsh (BFNL); Greater Western Victoria Rebels (Banyule Bears)
- Draft: No. 1, 2024 AFL draft
- Debut: Round 1, 2025, Richmond vs. Carlton, at MCG
- Height: 188 cm (6 ft 2 in)
- Position: Forward

Club information
- Current club: Richmond
- Number: 4

Playing career^{1}
Years	Club	Games (Goals)
2025–	Richmond	23 (24)
- ^{1} Playing statistics correct to the end of 2026.

Career highlights
- Allen Aylett Medal: 2024; AFL Rising Star nominee: 2025

Samuel Lalor (LAW-lah, born 30 August 2006) is an Australian rules footballer who plays for the Richmond Football Club in the Australian Football League (AFL). A powerful midfielder-forward, he was selected as the number-one pick in the 2024 AFL draft and made his debut in round 1 of the 2025 season.

== Early life and junior football ==
Lalor was raised in the Victorian country town of Bacchus Marsh, 50 kilometres north-west of Melbourne. He is one of four children to father Steve and mother Caitlyn. He grew up supporting Collingwood.

Lalor played junior football with Bacchus Marsh Football Club in the Ballarat Football Netball League (BFNL). He attended St Patrick's College in Ballarat through year 10 in 2022, and played for the school's football team during that time.

In 2022, at the age of 15, Lalor debuted for the Greater Western Victoria Rebels in the Talent League. He co-captained Vic Country in the AFL Under 16 National Championships, and was named in the tournament's All-Australian Team.

In addition to football, Lalor was a highly talented junior cricketer, playing as a top order batter and specialising in limited-overs formats. He represented Victoria's Country region at the 2022/23 Under 17 National Championships and played with the Northcote Cricket Club Under 17s and for the club's fourth division team in the Victorian Premier Cricket competition that same summer. Lalor had previously played extensive first XI cricket with Bacchus Marsh in the Gisborne & District Cricket Association, including scoring a century in January 2022 at age 15. He quit cricket to focus on football mid-way through 2023.

In 2023 Lalor moved schools, taking up a sporting scholarship to board at Geelong Grammar School, where he played for the school's cricket and football teams in the Associated Public Schools competitions. Despite being a year younger than most of his teammates, Lalor was that year selected to represent Vic Country at the 2023 AFL Under 18 Championships, where he played two matches. During that year he hyperextended his knee, an injury which lasted into the early months of the 2024 junior football season. Lalor spent a week with the Western Bulldogs in the summer of 2023/24, as part of the AFL Academy Program.

Lalor was appointed the Rebels Talent League captain in 2024, but managed just four matches with the side due to a range of injuries including to his hip, quadriceps and ankle. A further injury to his left hamstring ensured he missed his side's losing Talent League grand final against the Sandringham Dragons.

Lalor kicked three goals in each of Vic Country's final two matches of the 2024 AFL Under 18 Championships.

== AFL career ==
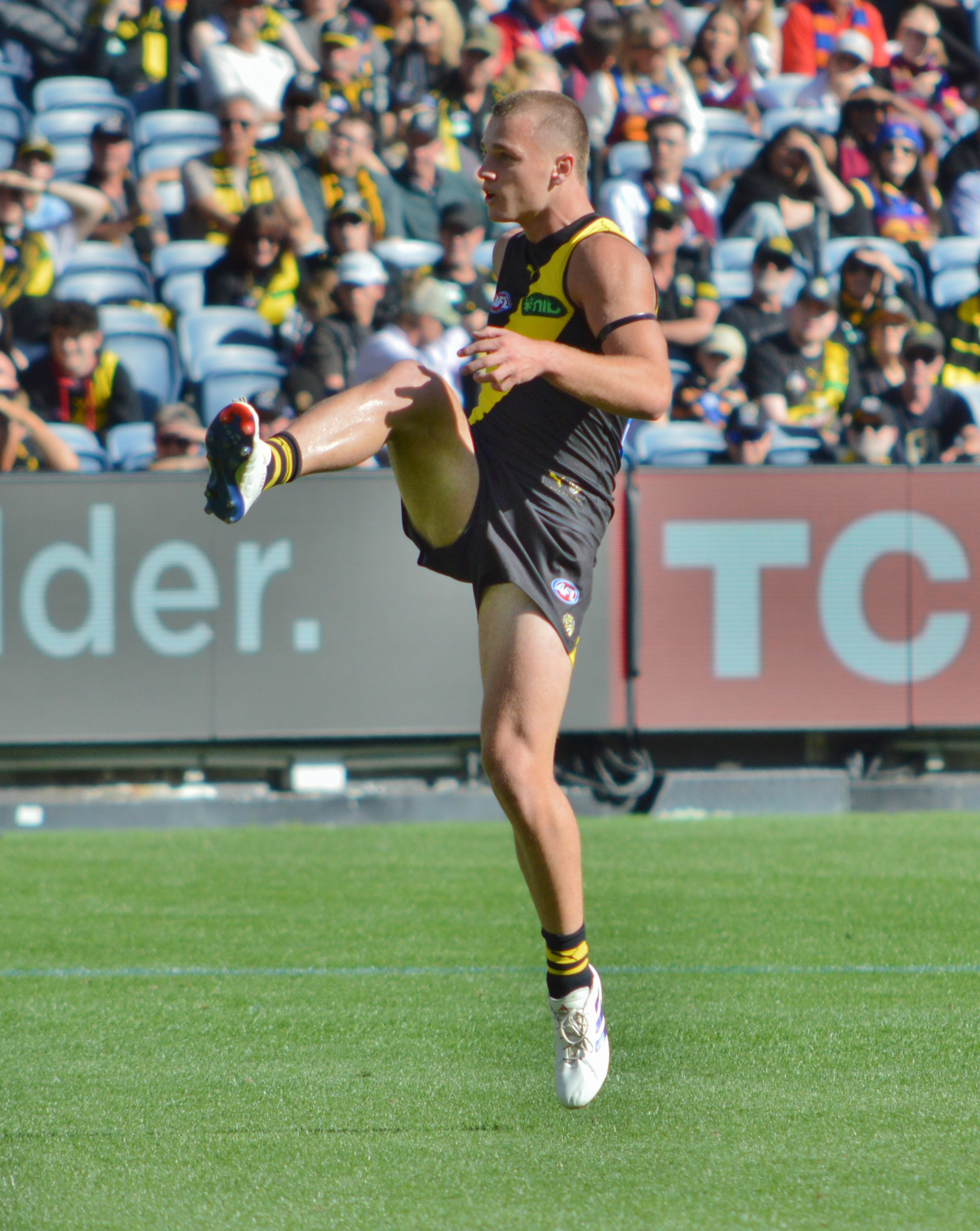
Lalor kicks for goal during the round 4 2025, AFL match between Richmond and Brisbane at the MCG.

Lalor was selected by Richmond with the 1st overall pick in the 2024 AFL draft.

In a pre-season practice match against West Coast in mid-February 2025, Lalor suffered a fractured jaw in a marking contest collision. He was unable to play in Richmond's practice march against Collingwood as a result. Lalor made his AFL debut in round 1 of the 2025 season, recording 18 disposals and kicking two goals in front of a crowd of 80,009 people at the MCG in a 13-point victory over Carlton. The effort earned Lalor the rising star nomination for round 1. However, this performance was quickly overshadowed by a wardrobe malfunction made during a goal celebration, in which his penis was shown unblurred on live television. The incident did, however, secure him a sponsorship deal with Australian underwear brand Bonds.

Returning from a minor hamstring injury, Lalor sustained a further hamstring injury early in Richmond's Round 17 match against Geelong. He was ruled out for the remainder of the season, finishing his maiden campaign with 11 games. He was named Richmond's best 1st-year player at their 2025 best and fairest awards.

== Player profile ==
Lalor plays as a midfielder and forward. He is notable for his strength and handballing skills from stoppage and for his one-on-one contest strength as a forward. As a junior, his playing style was compared to those of Jordan De Goey and Christian Petracca.

== Personal life ==
Lalor's grandfather Ray Lalor played 6 games for Essendon in 1956, while the family also has relation to John O'Neill, who played 136 games for Geelong. His father Steve, played for Benalla in the Ovens & Murray Football League (OMFL) during the 1980s.

Lalor's cousin, Jordan Petaia, is a rugby union player who represented Australia at the 2019 and 2023 Rugby World Cups, while another cousin, Jack Lalor, played with the Victoria cricket team's second XI in 2022 and has been a member of the Melbourne Renegades Academy program.

== Statistics ==
Updated to the end of round 22, 2026.

Legend
G	Goals	K	Kicks	D	Disposals	T	Tackles
B	Behinds	H	Handballs	M	Marks

Season	Team	No.	Games	Totals							Averages (per game)							Votes
Season	Team	No.	Games	G	B	K	H	D	M	T	G	B	K	H	D	M	T	Votes
2025	Richmond	22	11	11	5	55	77	132	33	26	1.0	0.5	5.0	7.0	12.0	3.0	2.4	0
2026	Richmond	4	11	13	8	98	60	158	38	29	1.2	0.7	8.9	5.5	14.4	3.5	2.6	1
Career			22	24	13	153	137	290	71	55	1.1	0.6	7.0	6.2	13.2	3.2	2.5	1
