= Walter Matthews =

Walter Matthews may refer to:

- Walter Matthews (politician) (1900–1986), member of the Canadian House of Commons
- Walter Matthews (priest) (1881–1973), British Anglican priest, Dean of St Paul's Cathedral
- Walt Matthews (1934–2014), baseball player for Houston Astros
- Wal Matthews (1894–1973), Australian rules footballer for South Melbourne

== See also ==
- Walter Mathews (disambiguation)
