= Mount Mill =

Mountain in Graham Land, Antarctica

Mount Mill (65°15′S 64°3′W) is a mountain, 735 metres (2,410 ft), standing 2 nautical miles (4 km) west of Mount Balch on the northeast shore of Waddington Bay, on the west coast of Graham Land, Antarctica. It was first charted by the Belgian Antarctic Expedition, 1897–99, and was named by the Fourth French Antarctic Expedition, 1908–10, under Jean-Baptiste Charcot, for British geographer Hugh Robert Mill, an Antarctic historian and author in 1905 of The Siege of the South Pole.
