= Bussey Glacier =

Glacier in Antarctica

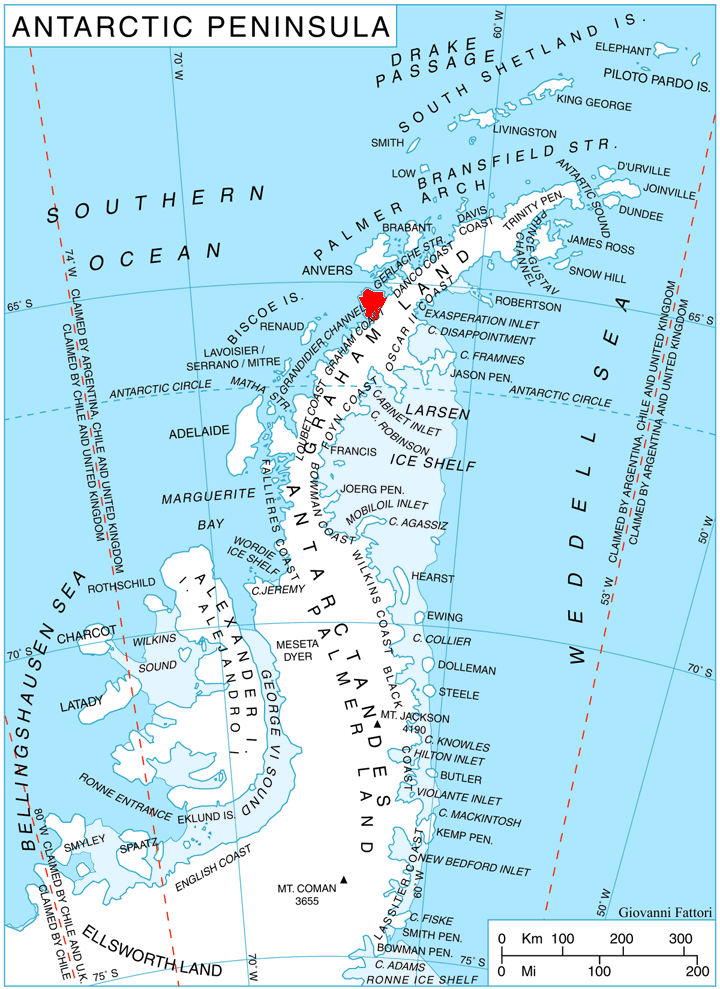
- Location of Kyiv Peninsula in Graham Land, Antarctic Peninsula

- Location within Antarctica
- Location: Graham Land
- Coordinates: 65°16′00″S 64°1′00″W
- Thickness: unknown
- Highest elevation: 454 m (1,490 ft)
- Terminus: Waddington Bay
- Status: unknown

Bussey Glacier (65°16′S 64°1′W) is a glacier flowing west from Mount Peary to the head of Waddington Bay on Kyiv Peninsula on the west coast of Graham Land. It was first charted by the French Antarctic Expedition under Jean-Baptiste Charcot, 1908–10, and named by the UK Antarctic Place-Names Committee in 1959 for Group Captain John Bussey of the Directorate of Overseas Surveys.

== See also ==
- List of glaciers in the Antarctic
- Glaciology
