= Mount Balch =

Mountain in Graham Land, Antarctica

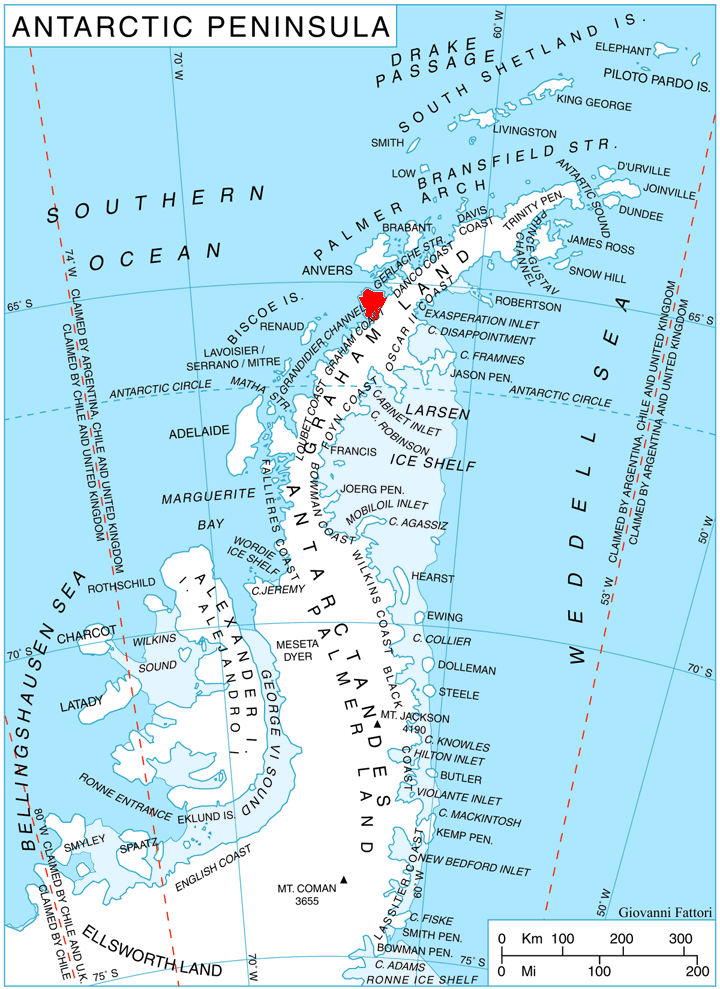
Location of Kyiv Peninsula in Graham Land, Antarctic Peninsula.

Mount Balch (65°16′S 63°59′W) is an east-west trending mountain with numerous sharp peaks, the highest 1,105 m, between Mount Peary and Mount Mill on Kyiv Peninsula, west coast of Graham Land. It was discovered by the French Antarctic Expedition of 1908–1910 under Charcot and named by him for Edwin Swift Balch, an American author and authority on Antarctic exploration.
