= Andy Kennedy (Australian footballer) =

Australian rules footballer

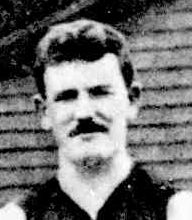

Personal information
- Full name: Andrew Francis Michael Kennedy
- Born: 26 November 1883; Devenish, Victoria
- Died: 10 April 1946 (aged 62); Buchan, Victoria
- Original team: Benalla
- Height: 177 cm (5 ft 10 in)

Playing career^{1}
Years	Club	Games (Goals)
1906	Carlton	2 (0)
1908	Melbourne	1 (0)
Total		3 (0)
- ^{1} Playing statistics correct to the end of 1908.

Andrew Francis Michael Kennedy (26 November 1883 – 10 April 1946) was an Australian rules footballer who played for the Carlton Football Club and Melbourne Football Club in the Victorian Football League (VFL).

A policeman, he played for the police team after his two games for Carlton in 1906, before playing a single game for Melbourne in 1908.
