= Ray Lalor =

Australian rules footballer

Personal information
- Full name: Ray George Lalor
- Born: 30 August 1936
- Died: 29 April 2021 (aged 84)
- Original teams: Benalla, Doutta Stars
- Height: 173 cm (5 ft 8 in)
- Weight: 73 kg (161 lb)
- Positions: Rover, half-forward

Playing career^{1}
Years	Club	Games (Goals)
1956	Essendon	6 (2)
- ^{1} Playing statistics correct to the end of 1956.

Ray Lalor (born 30 August 1936 - 29 April 2021) was an Australian rules footballer who played with Essendon in the Victorian Football League (VFL). He later played for Dandenong in the Victorian Football Association (VFA), then his old club's, Doutta Stars, and Benalla in country Victoria.

Lalor first played with Benalla in the Ovens & Murray Football League in 1951.

Lalor also played in the Melbourne District Cricket competition for North Melbourne Cricket Club.

Lalor's grandson is Richmond player, Sam Lalor.
