= Mount Touring Club =

Mountain in Graham Land, Antarctica

Mount Touring Club (65°17′S 63°56′W) is a small snow-capped peak near the extremity of a spur that descends southwestward from Mount Peary, on the west side of Graham Land. Discovered and named "Sommet du Touring Club" by the French Antarctic Expedition (1908–10) under Dr. Jean-Baptiste Charcot. A party from the expedition hiked along the southern side of this feature in the course of charting the area.
