= Bert Lenne =

Australian rules footballer (1889-1973)

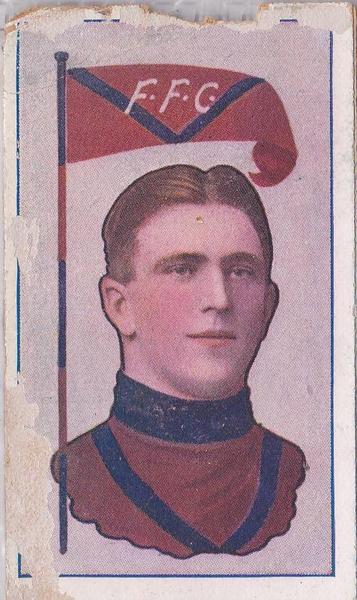
- Cigarette card of Lenne in 1912

Personal information
- Full name: Hubert Carl Lenne
- Born: 2 August 1889; St Kilda, Victoria
- Died: 19 November 1973 (aged 84); Malvern East, Victoria
- Original teams: Northcote, Fitzroy juniors
- Height: 183 cm (6 ft 0 in)
- Weight: 79 kg (174 lb)
- Position: Full back

Playing career^{1}
Years	Club	Games (Goals)
1910–1922	Fitzroy	157 (7)
1923–1924	St Kilda	21 (0)
Total		178 (7)

Representative team honours^{2}
Years	Team	Games (Goals)
1912	Victoria	2 (0)
- ^{1} Playing statistics correct to the end of 1924.^{2} Representative statistics correct as of 1912.

Hubert Carl "Bert" Lenne (2 August 1889 – 19 November 1973) was an Australian rules footballer who played with Fitzroy and St Kilda in the Victorian Football League (VFL).

Lenne played as a defender, most often at full-back, and spent 13 seasons with Fitzroy from his debut in 1910. A premiership player in 1913 and 1916, Lenne left Fitzroy after being omitted from their 1922 Grand Final side. He finished his career with two seasons at St Kilda.

In 1927, Lenne was appointed as captain / coach of the Benalla Football Club in the Ovens & Murray Football League.
