= Jack Bridgfoot =

Australian rules footballer, born 1910

Personal information
- Full name: John Charles Bridgfoot
- Born: 28 September 1910; Benalla, Victoria
- Died: 16 April 1946 (aged 35); Preston, Victoria
- Original team: Benalla Imperials
- Height: 184 cm (6 ft 0 in)
- Weight: 84 kg (185 lb)

Playing career^{1}
Years	Club	Games (Goals)
1935–37	Footscray	35 (5)
- ^{1} Playing statistics correct to the end of 1937.

John Charles Bridgfoot (28 September 1910 – 16 April 1946) was an Australian rules footballer who played with Footscray in the Victorian Football League (VFL).

== Family ==
John Charles Bridgfoot, the son of Henry Francis Bridgfoot (1880-1931), and Mary Jenkins Bridgfoot (1886-1958), née Nicholson, was born at Benalla, Victoria on 28 September 1910.

He married Daphne Emily Tanner (1913-1999) in 1935. They had three sons: Geoffrey, Rodney, and Peter.

== Football ==
Recruited from the Benalla Football Club in the Ovens & Murray Football League.

== Death ==
He died at Preston, Victoria on 16 April 1946.
