= Vin Williams =

Australian rules footballer (1932–1974)

Personal information
- Full name: Vincent James Williams
- Born: 10 July 1932; Benalla, Victoria
- Died: 24 July 1974 (aged 42); Elwood, Victoria
- Original team: Castlemaine
- Height: 178 cm (5 ft 10 in)
- Weight: 73 kg (161 lb)
- Position: Wing

Playing career^{1}
Years	Club	Games (Goals)
1952–59	Fitzroy	93 (7)
- ^{1} Playing statistics correct to the end of 1959.

Vincent James Williams (10 July 1932 – 24 July 1974) was an Australian rules footballer who played with Fitzroy in the Victorian Football League (VFL).

== Football ==
Williams was offered the Shepparton coaching position in 1960, which eventually went to Tom Hafey but Williams opted for the Benalla role and lead them from 1960 to 1963 which included an Ovens & Murray Football League grand final loss in 1961 and two premierships in 1962 and 1963.
