= Kevin Sykes =

Australian rules footballer

Personal information
- Full name: Kevin Sykes
- Born: 15 February 1946 (age 80)
- Original team: Benalla
- Height: 188 cm (6 ft 2 in)
- Weight: 80 kg (176 lb)

Playing career^{1}
Years	Club	Games (Goals)
1968	North Melbourne	3 (0)
- ^{1} Playing statistics correct to the end of 1968.

Kevin Sykes (born 15 February 1946) is a former Australian rules footballer who played with North Melbourne in the Victorian Football League (VFL).

Kevin won Benalla’s best and fairest in 1967.
