= Wadding (surname) =

Wadding is a surname, and may refer to

- Joey Wadding, Irish Gaelic footballer
- Luke Wadding (1588–1657), Irish Franciscan historian
- Luke Wadding (died 1687), bishop of Ferns
- Michael Wadding (priest) (1591–1644), Irish Catholic missionary
- Michael Wadding (referee), Irish hurling referee
- Michael Wadding (television), British television producer
- Peter Wadding (c. 1581 – 1644), Irish jesuit

== See also ==
- Wadding (disambiguation)
- Waddington (surname)
