= John Thompson (Australian footballer, born 1938) =

Australian rules footballer

Personal information
- Full name: John Laurence Thompson
- Born: 21 June 1938; Benalla, Victoria
- Died: 11 February 1999 (aged 60); Queensland
- Original team: Benalla
- Height: 185 cm (6 ft 1 in)
- Weight: 76 kg (168 lb)

Playing career^{1}
Years	Club	Games (Goals)
1959–1963	Richmond	65 (0)
- ^{1} Playing statistics correct to the end of 1963.

John Laurence Thompson (21 June 1938 – 11 February 1999) was an Australian rules footballer who played with Richmond in the Victorian Football League (VFL).

== Career ==
Thompson, a centre half-back originally from Benalla, was on a permit from Ararat when he came to Richmond in the 1959 VFL season and made three league appearances. The following year Ararat cleared him to Richmond, on the agreement that he would cleared back if he didn't become a regular member of the side. He was however able to cement a spot in the team and played 62 more games for Richmond, over four years, which included a stint as vice captain. During his time at Richmond, Thompson had a full-time job in Ararat and had to travel 500 miles to train.

After leaving Richmond, Thompson was captain-coach of Mortlake in the Hampden Football League and got the club into a grand final in 1966, which they lost to Warrnambool. He led Mortlake to another grand final in 1967 and they were again unable to get the win, this time going down to Terang.

== Later life ==
Thompson worked in the legal profession and also had involvement in the racing industry.

He died on 11 February 1999, aged 60.
