= Walter Mathews =

Walter Mathews may refer to:

- Walter J. Mathews (1850–1947), American architect
- Walter Mathews (actor) (1926–2012), American character actor

== See also ==
- Walter Matthews (disambiguation)
