= Michael Stilo =

Australian rules footballer

Personal information
- Full name: Michael Stilo
- Born: 8 November 1951 (age 74)
- Original team: Benalla
- Height: 179 cm (5 ft 10 in)
- Weight: 81 kg (179 lb)

Playing career^{1}
Years	Club	Games (Goals)
1973	North Melbourne	1 (0)
1975–1976	South Melbourne	12 (4)
- ^{1} Playing statistics correct to the end of 1976.

Michael Stilo (born 8 November 1951) is a former Australian rules footballer who played with North Melbourne and South Melbourne in the Victorian Football League (VFL), and Brunswick in the Victorian Football Association (VFA), during the 1970s.

Stilo returned to Benalla as captain coach in 1983.
