= Fred Beeson =

Australian rules footballer (1901–1956)

Personal information
- Full name: Frederick James Beeson
- Born: 22 October 1901; Kensington, Victoria
- Died: 3 August 1956 (aged 54); Castlemaine, Victoria
- Original team: Benalla
- Height: 173 cm (5 ft 8 in)
- Weight: 76 kg (168 lb)

Playing career^{1}
Years	Club	Games (Goals)
1924–1925	Fitzroy (VFL)	2 (2)
1925–1926	Coburg (VFA)	11 (2)
1927	Northcote (VFA)	5 (14)
1928	Yarraville (VFA)	2 (6)
- ^{1} Playing statistics correct to the end of 1928.

Frederick James Beeson (22 October 1901 – 3 August 1956) was an Australian rules footballer who played with Fitzroy in the Victorian Football League (VFL).

== Family ==
The son of John Charles Beeson (1876-1906), and Agnes Louisa Beeson (1879-1952), née Schwab, later Mrs. George Edward Lawton, Frederick James Beeson was born at Kensington, Victoria on 22 October 1901.

He married Lillian Emilie Maynard (1908-1994) in 1928.

== Football ==
External images
- Fred Beeson, Benalla F.C. (1923).
- Fred Beeson, Coburg F.C. (1926).

Beeson was recruited from the Benalla Football Club, where he kicked 68 goals in the Ovens and Murray Football League in 1923.

Beeson kicked two goals on his VFL debut with Fitzroy against Carlton up until he was injured.

He later played for Coburg, Northcote, and Yarraville.

== Boxing ==
Beeson was also an amateur boxer.
