= Ken Walker (footballer) =

Australian rules footballer

Personal information
- Full name: Kenneth H. Walker
- Born: 17 October 1919; Bendigo, Victoria
- Died: 25 July 2013 (aged 93)
- Original team: Preston
- Height: 183 cm (6 ft 0 in)
- Weight: 83 kg (183 lb)

Playing career^{1}
Years	Club	Games (Goals)
1938–1945	St Kilda	109 (81)
- ^{1} Playing statistics correct to the end of 1945.

Kenneth H. Walker (17 October 1919 – 25 July 2013) was an Australian rules footballer who played with St Kilda in the Victorian Football League (VFL).

Walker, a key position player, played 109 games for St Kilda, from 1938 to 1945. He won St Kilda's Best and fairest award back to back in 1942 and 1943.

He was playing coach of Burnie in 1946, then coached Launceston to three successive grand finals, which were all lost to rival North Launceston.

In 1950 and 1951, Walker was captain-coach of Benalla.

Walker was later elected as the inaugural President of the Benalla Junior Football League in 1953.

For many years, Walker was part of the ground staff at the Moorabbin Oval.

== Links ==
- 1950 - Benalla FC team photo
- 1951 - Ken Walker photo
