= Charles Waddington =

Charles Waddington may refer to:

- Charles Waddington (East India Company officer) (1796–1858), major-general Bombay engineers
- Charles Waddington (philosopher) (1819–1914), French philosopher and writer
