= Terry Boyle (Australian footballer) =

Australian rules footballer

Personal information
- Full name: Terence William Raymond Boyle
- Born: 2 May 1920; Tocumwal, New South Wales
- Died: 2 January 1977 (aged 56); Glenelg, South Australia
- Height: 173 cm (5 ft 8 in)
- Weight: 72 kg (159 lb)

Playing career^{1}
Years	Club	Games (Goals)
1942	Hawthorn	2 (0)
- ^{1} Playing statistics correct to the end of 1942.

Terence William Raymond Boyle (2 May 1920 – 2 January 1977) was an Australian rules footballer who played with Hawthorn in the Victorian Football League (VFL).

Boyle played with Benalla in 1946.
