= John Bussey =

British RAF officer (1895–1979)

Group Captain John Bussey, OBE (1895–1979) was in charge of Reconnaissance for the British Royal Air Force during World War II. As Directorate of Overseas Surveys he had an Antarctic glacier named after him: the Bussey Glacier.

He was on board the Imperial Airways flying boat Courtier which crash landed near Athens in 1937.
