= Mount Peary =

Mountain in Graham Land, Antarctica

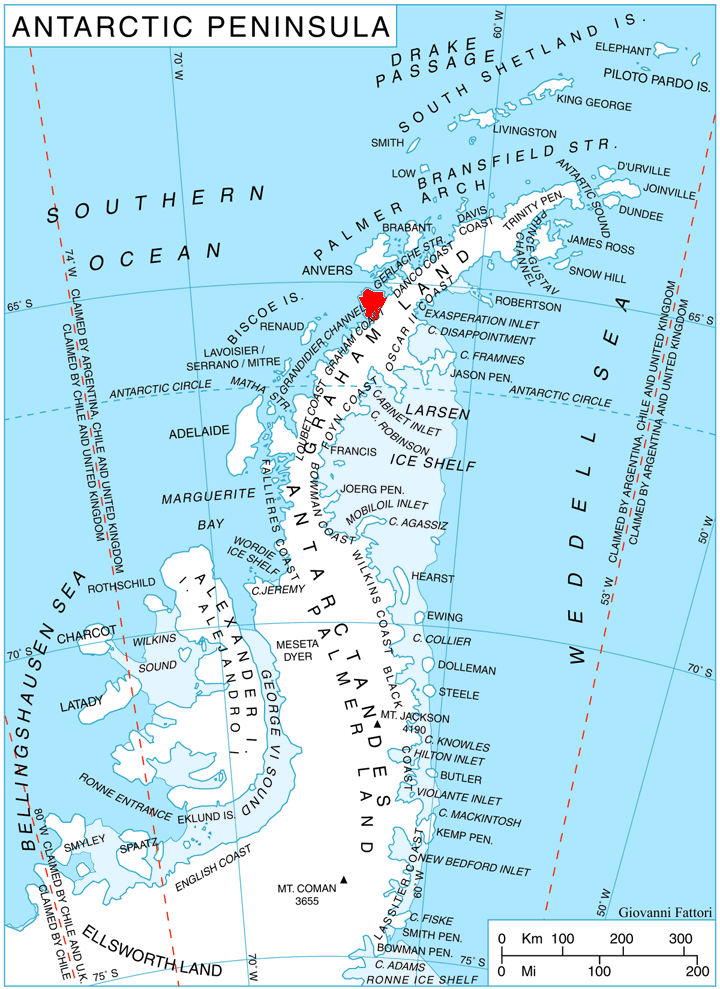
Location of Kyiv Peninsula in Graham Land, Antarctic Peninsula.

Mount Peary (65°15′S 63°52′W) is a conspicuous massif, 1,900 m, with a flat, snow-covered summit several miles in extent, surmounted by a marginal peak on the west, standing 7 nautical miles (13 km) east-northeast of Cape Tuxen and dominating the area between Wiggins and Bussey Glaciers on Kyiv Peninsula in Graham Land. Discovered by the French Antarctic Expedition, 1908–10, under Charcot and named by him for R. Admiral Robert E. Peary, U.S. Navy, American Arctic explorer and first to attain the North Pole, in 1909.

In 1976, three men in an expedition died while climbing the mountain.

== See also ==
- Mount Touring Club
