= Andrew Dale =

Australian rules footballer and horse trainer

Personal information
- Full name: Andrew Dale
- Born: 19 April 1962 (age 64)
- Original teams: Eltham, (Diamond Valley FL)

Playing career^{1}
Years	Club	Games (Goals)
1986	Melbourne	2 (0)
- ^{1} Playing statistics correct to the end of 1986.

Andrew Dale (born 19 April 1962) is a former Australian rules footballer who played for Melbourne in the Victorian Football League (VFL) in 1986. He played two games with Melbourne in the 1986 VFL season.

He was recruited from Diamond Valley Football League club Eltham, where he was a senior coach in 1988.

Dale was captain / coach of Benalla Football Club in the Ovens and Murray Football League in 1993 and 1994, then was captain / coach of Myrtleford Football Club from 1995 to 1997. He then coached New Norfolk Football Club in Tasmania in 1998 and 1999, before returning to live Myrtleford.

Andrew Dale is currently a successful horse trainer based in Wangaratta, Victoria.
