= Bert Ringrose =

English footballer (1916–1968)

Personal information
- Full name: Albert Arthur Ringrose
- Date of birth: 8 November 1916
- Place of birth: Edmonton, England
- Date of death: 1968 (aged 51–52)
- Height: 5 ft 9 in (1.75 m)
- Position: Full back

Youth career
- Tottenham Juniors

Senior career*
Years	Team	Apps	(Gls)
1934	Tottenham Hotspur	0	(0)
1934–1936	Northfleet United	?	(?)
1936–1937	Tottenham Hotspur	10	(0)
1939	Notts County	1	(0)
- * Club domestic league appearances and goals

Albert Arthur Ringrose (8 November 1916 – 1968) was an English professional footballer who played for Tottenham Juniors, Northfleet United, Tottenham Hotspur and Notts County.

== Football career ==
Ringrose began his career at Tottenham Juniors. He joined Tottenham Hotspur in 1934 before joining the club's "nursery" team Northfleet United. The full back rejoined the Spurs in 1936 and made 10 appearances for the club. Ringrose transferred to Notts County in May, 1939 where he featured in one match.
