= Wal Matthews =

Australian rules footballer

Personal information
- Full name: Llewellyn Walter Matthews
- Born: 12 May 1894; Hopetoun, Victoria
- Died: 12 March 1973 (aged 78); Kew, Victoria
- Original team: Port Melbourne
- Height: 183 cm (6 ft 0 in)
- Weight: 81 kg (179 lb)

Playing career^{1}
Years	Club	Games (Goals)
1922–24	South Melbourne	22 (7)
- ^{1} Playing statistics correct to the end of 1924.

Llewellyn Walter Matthews (12 May 1894 – 12 March 1973) was an Australian rules footballer who played with South Melbourne in the Victorian Football League (VFL).

Matthews coached Nagambie in 1925, before being appointed as captain / coach of Benalla Football Club in the Ovens & Murray Football League in June 1926.
