= Tom McEwan (footballer) =

Australian rules footballer

Personal information
- Full name: Thomas Henry McEwan
- Born: 14 December 1885; Benalla, Victoria
- Died: 16 June 1958 (aged 72); Benalla, Victoria
- Original team: Benalla
- Height: 179 cm (5 ft 10 in)
- Weight: 81 kg (179 lb)

Playing career^{1}
Years	Club	Games (Goals)
1909	Richmond	2 (0)
- ^{1} Playing statistics correct to the end of 1909.

Thomas Henry McEwan (14 December 1885 – 16 June 1958) was an Australian rules footballer who played with Richmond in the Victorian Football League (VFL).
