= Waddington Bay =

Bay in Graham Land, Antarctica

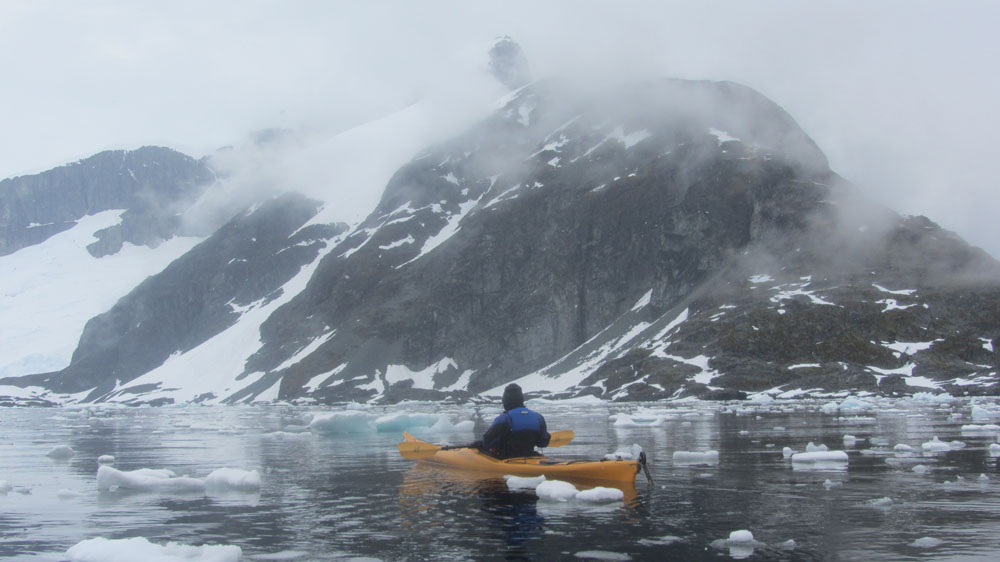
- Kayaking in the bay

- Location: Kyiv Peninsula, Graham Land, Antarctica
- Coordinates: 65°16′S 64°5′W
- Type: Bay
- Etymology: named for Senator Waddington, president of the Chamber of Commerce at Rouen
- Max. length: 2 nautical miles (3.7 km)
- Max. width: 1 nautical mile (1.9 km)

Waddington Bay is an Antarctic bay 2 nautical miles (3.7 km) long, in a NW-SE direction, and 1 nautical mile (1.9 km) wide, indenting the west coast of Kyiv Peninsula, Graham Land, immediately north of Cape Tuxen. This bay is partially defined on the charts of the Belgian Antarctic Expedition, 1897–99, under Gerlache. It was more fully delineated by the French Antarctic Expedition, 1908–10, under Charcot, who named it for Senator Waddington, president of the Chamber of Commerce at Rouen.

A gentoo penguin colony was discovered at the southern headland of Waddington Bay in January 2014 by a group of kayakers.

Waddington Bay within Antarctica

== See also ==
- Waddington Bay (British Columbia)
- Waddington (disambiguation)

== Gallery ==
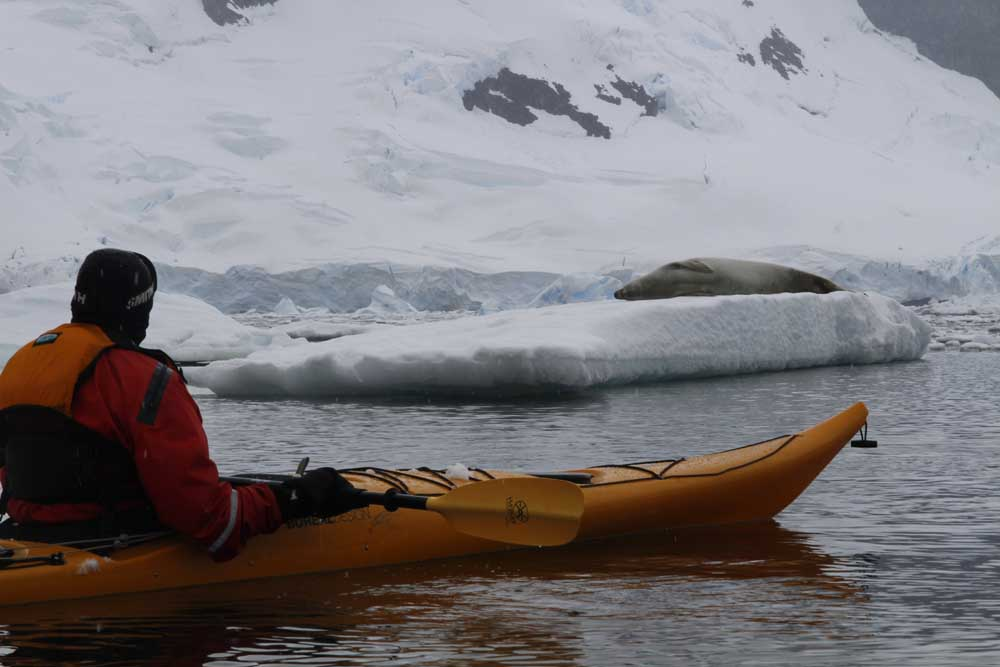
Kayaker watches seal in Waddington Bay

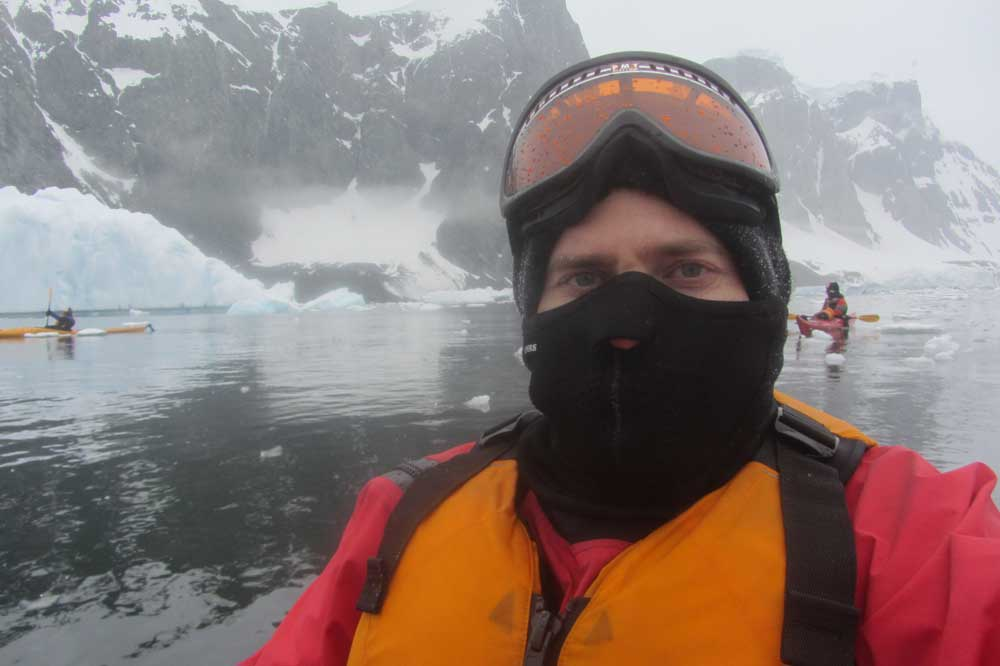
Kayaker in Waddington Bay

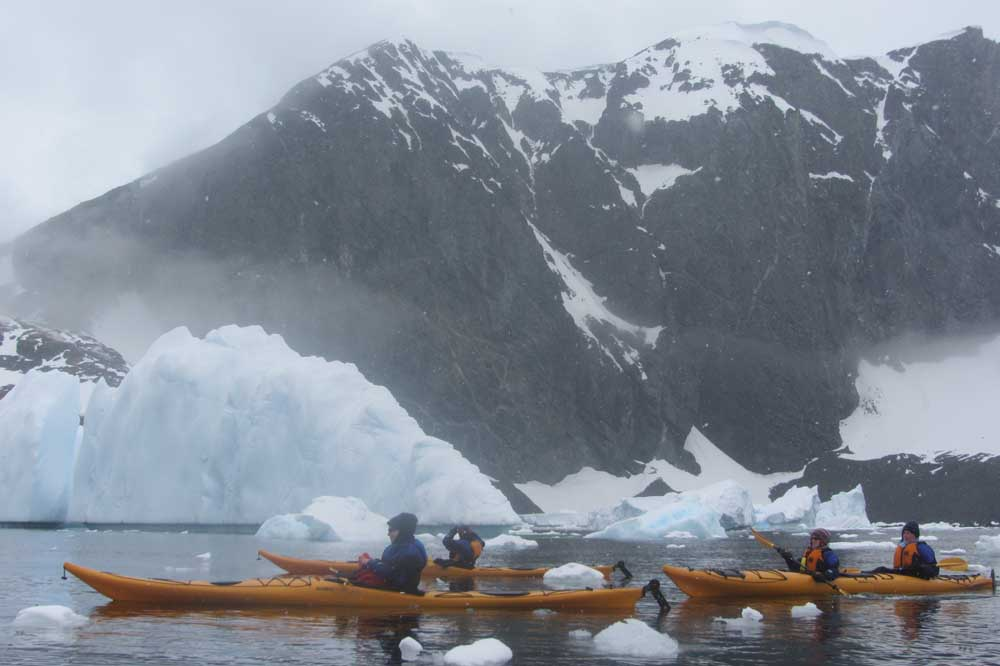
Kayakers in Waddington Bay

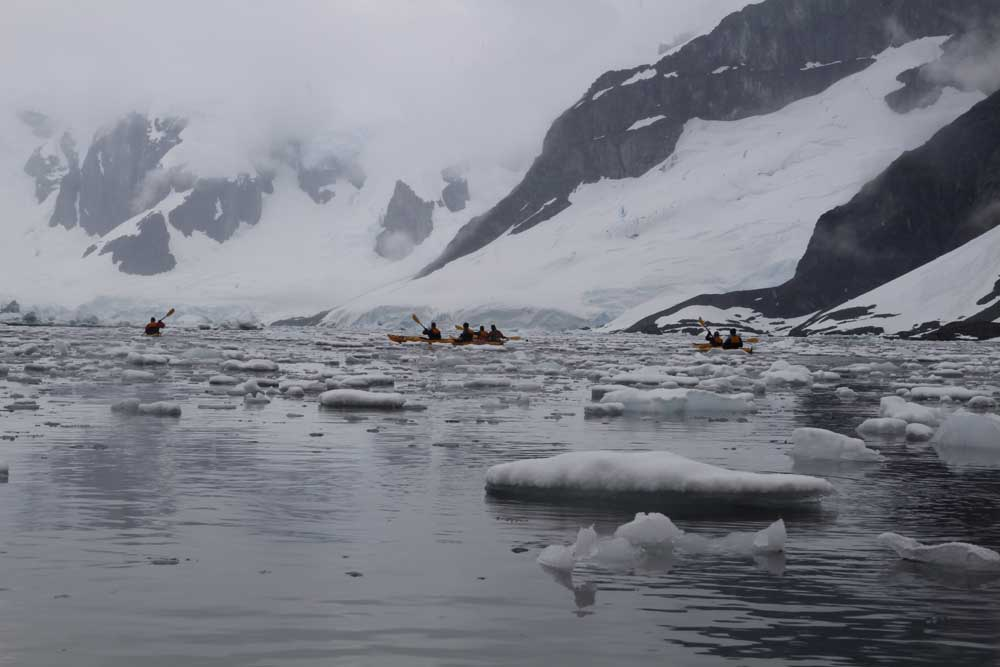
Kayaking in Waddington Bay

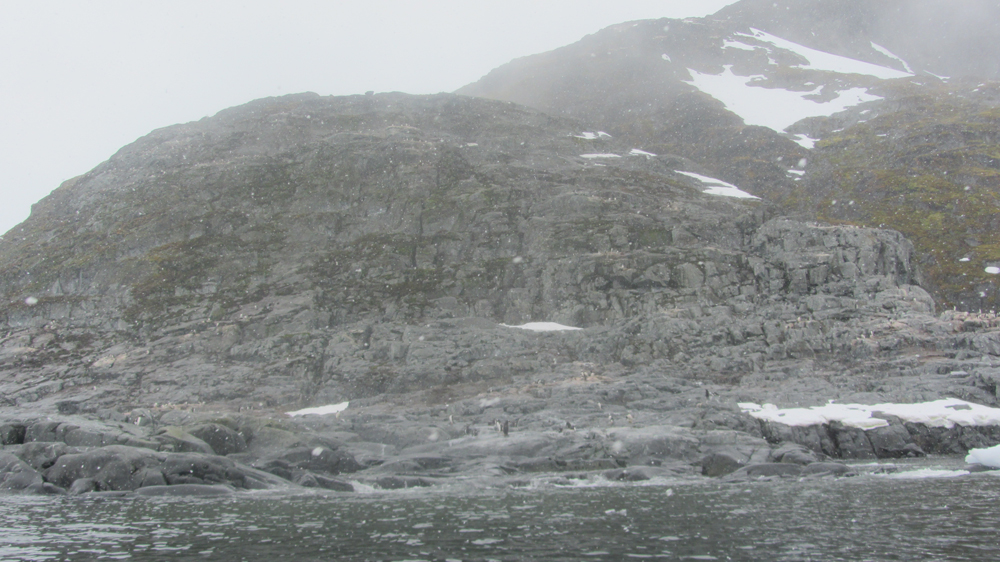
Gentoo penguin colony at southern headland of Waddington Bay
