= Steve Hickey (footballer) =

Australian rules footballer

Personal information
- Born: 28 October 1965 (age 61)
- Original team: Benalla
- Height: 180 cm (5 ft 11 in)
- Weight: 83 kg (183 lb)
- Position: Utility

Playing career^{1}
Years	Club	Games (Goals)
1985–88	North Melbourne	37 (2)
- ^{1} Playing statistics correct to the end of 1988.

Steve Hickey (born 28 October 1965) is a former Australian rules footballer who played with North Melbourne in the Victorian Football League (VFL).

Hickey was captain / coach of Benalla All Blacks Football Club in 1995 in the Tungamah Football League, winning their senior football best and fairest award.

Hickey was then captain / coach of Benalla in the Ovens & Murray Football League in 1996 and 1997.

Hickey coached Glenrowan Football Club in the Ovens & King Football League in 2009 and 2010.
