= Cape Tuxen =

Cape in northern Antarctica

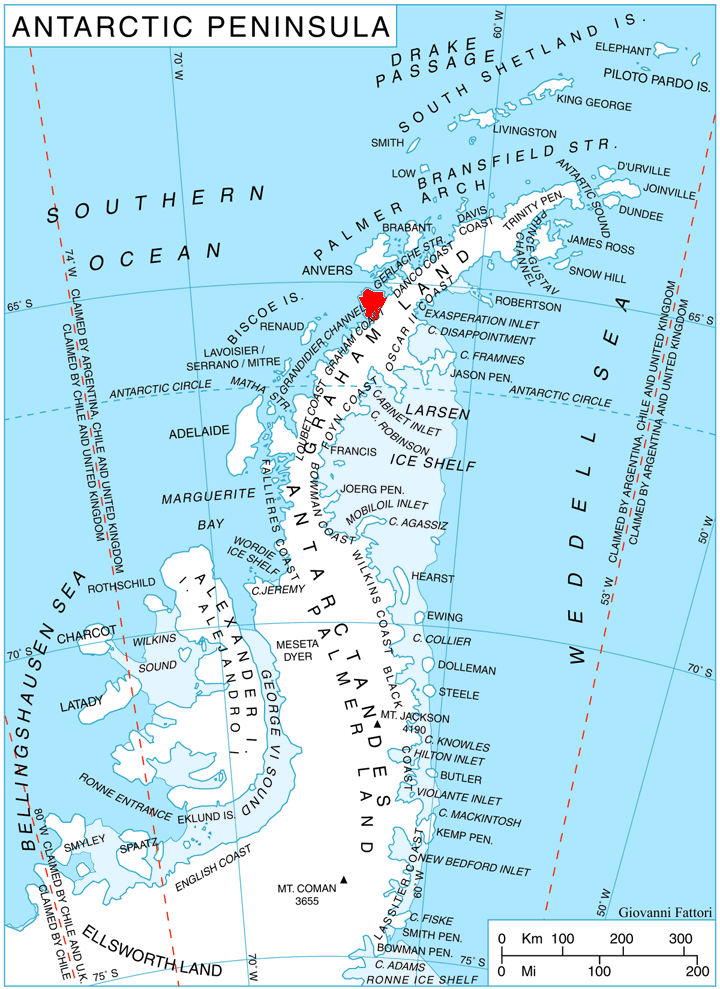
Location of Kyiv Peninsula in Graham Land, Antarctic Peninsula

Cape Tuxen (65°16′S 64°8′W) is a rocky cape forming the south side of the entrance to Waddington Bay on Kyiv Peninsula, the west coast of Graham Land. Discovered and named by the Belgian Antarctic Expedition, 1897–1899, under Gerlache.
