= John Waddington (Essex cricketer) =

English cricketer

John Ernest Walter Waddington (22 May 1910 – 8 April 1995) was an English cricketer active in 1931 who played for Woodford Wells Cricket Club now known as Woodford Wells Club and once for Essex. He was born in Woodford Green and educated at Chigwell School and Jesus College, Cambridge. He appeared in just one first-class match as a righthanded batsman who scored eight runs, his highest score was therefore 8. During the Second World War he served in the Manchester Regiment fighting in Normandy and subsequently in Germany. He died in Godstone, Surrey.
