= Graeme Jonson =

Australian rules footballer

Personal information
- Full name: Graeme Jonson
- Born: 26 October 1940 (age 86)
- Original team: Bairnsdale
- Height: 188 cm (6 ft 2 in)
- Weight: 90 kg (198 lb)

Playing career^{1}
Years	Club	Games (Goals)
1960, 1962–63	Collingwood	7 (1)
- ^{1} Playing statistics correct to the end of 1963.

Graeme Jonson is a former Australian rules footballer who played with Collingwood in the Victorian Football League (VFL).
