= Len Halley =

Australian rules footballer

Personal information
- Full name: Harold Leonard Halley
- Born: 7 March 1951 (age 75)
- Original team: Healesville
- Height: 191 cm (6 ft 3 in)
- Weight: 92 kg (203 lb)
- Position: Ruckman

Playing career^{1}
Years	Club	Games (Goals)
1970–1973	Essendon	35 (11)
1975–1979	West Perth	58 (28)
- ^{1} Playing statistics correct to the end of 1973.

Career highlights
- 1975 West Perth premiership player

Harold Leonard "Len" Halley (born 7 March 1951) is a former Australian rules footballer who played with Essendon in the Victorian Football League (VFL).

== Career ==
=== Essendon ===
Recruited from Healesville in 1966, Halley began in the Essendon under-19s. In 1968 he won the under-19s best and fairest award and was also a member of Essendon's reserves premiership team that year. A ruckman, he started his VFL career two years later, with nine appearances in the second half of the 1970 season. He was called up for national service in 1971 and only played five league games. In 1972 he won Essendon's "best clubman" award in a season in which he played 17 games, including an elimination final. He was mostly in the reserves in 1973 and won the team's best and fairest award.

=== Post VFL career ===
Halley played in Tasmania for East Devonport in 1974. The following year he joined West Perth and was a member of the team which defeated South Fremantle by a record 104-points to win the 1975 WANFL Grand Final. He remained with West Perth in 1976, then spent the 1977 VFA season with Brunswick. In 1978 and 1979 he was back at West Perth. In 1980 he began his coaching career with a two-year stint as captain-coach of Tatura in the Goulburn Valley Football League. After two seasons with Benalla, Halley returned to his original club Healesville in 1984. He captain-coached Diamond Valley Football League club Montmorency in 1985, then had a season with Warrandyte.
