= Brian Symes =

Australian rules footballer

Personal information
- Full name: Brian Symes
- Born: 22 September 1952 (age 74)
- Original team: Benalla
- Height: 183 cm (6 ft 0 in)
- Weight: 83 kg (183 lb)

Playing career^{1}
Years	Club	Games (Goals)
1972	North Melbourne	2 (0)
- ^{1} Playing statistics correct to the end of 1972.

Brian Symes (born 22 September 1952) is a former Australian rules footballer who played with North Melbourne in the Victorian Football League (VFL).

Symes returned to Benalla for the 1973 and 1974 seasons, then was appointed as captain-coach of Euroa in the Goulburn Valley League in 1975.
