= Chris Elliott (footballer) =

Australian rules footballer

Personal information
- Full name: Chris Elliott
- Born: 6 October 1953
- Died: 22 July 2017 (aged 63)
- Original team: Benalla
- Height: 171 cm (5 ft 7 in)
- Weight: 70 kg (154 lb)
- Position: Rover

Playing career^{1}
| Years | Club | Games (Goals) |
| 1976–77 | South Melbourne | 8 (1) |
- ^{1} Playing statistics correct to the end of 1977.

Chris Elliott (6 October 1953 – 22 July 2017) was an Australian rules footballer who played with South Melbourne in the Victorian Football League (VFL).
