= Neil Busse =

Australian rules footballer

Personal information
- Full name: Neil Busse
- Born: 3 April 1945
- Original team: Benalla / Sandringham
- Height: 189 cm (6 ft 2 in)
- Weight: 83 kg (183 lb)
- Position: Ruck / Defence

Playing career^{1}
Years	Club	Games (Goals)
1964–67	Richmond	37 (9)
1968–69	South Melbourne	18 (2)
Total		55 (11)
- ^{1} Playing statistics correct to the end of 1969.

Neil Busse (born 3 April 1945) is a former Australian rules footballer who played with Richmond and South Melbourne in the Victorian Football League (VFL).

He was a member of the AFL Tribunal for eighteen years, the last ten as chairperson, until his retirement in November 1997.
