= Alan Garton =

British biochemist

George Alan Garton
- Born: 4 June 1922; Scarborough, Yorkshire
- Died: 13 May 2010 (aged 87)
- Scientific career
- Fields: Biochemistry

George Alan Garton FRS (4 June 1922 in Scarborough, Yorkshire – 13 May 2010) was a British biochemist, and Head of the Lipid Biochemistry Department, at the Rowett Research Institute, now part of the University of Aberdeen.

He was elected a Fellow of the Royal Society in 1978.

His candidature citation read: "Distinguished for his careful, thorough and imaginative studies on digestion, absorption and metabolism of fatty acids, particularly in ruminants. His recent work on branched chain fatty acids is particularly noteworthy. He showed, for example, that in cows fed grass silage the phytanic acid found in their plasma lipids originates from chlorophyll. He then went on to discover other novel branched-chain acids in sheep fed carbohydrate-rich diets. These compounds are of great significance arising, as they do, from excess propionate produced by rumen fermentation. This occurs because the conversion of propionate into methylmalonyl-Coenzyme A (a vitamin B-12 – dependent reaction) is rate-limiting and hence the ability of the animal to channel propionate into the tricarboxylic acid cycle is considerably reduced. This work opens up a completely new field of lipid biochemistry. "

The 55th International Conference on the Bioscience of Lipids, will be held in his memory.
