= Doug Ringrose =

Australian rules footballer, born 1900

Personal information
- Full name: Douglas Leslie Ringrose
- Born: 4 August 1900; Hobart, Tasmania
- Died: 28 December 1953 (aged 53); Alfred Hospital, Prahran, Victoria
- Original teams: West Melbourne, Brighton (VFA)
- Height: 163 cm (5 ft 4 in)
- Weight: 63 kg (139 lb)

Playing career^{1}
Years	Club	Games (Goals)
1928–1929	Fitzroy	35 (30)

Coaching career
Years	Club	Games (W–L–D)
1929	Fitzroy	10 (2–8–0)
- ^{1} Playing statistics correct to the end of 1929.

Douglas Leslie Ringrose (4 August 1900 – 28 December 1953) was an Australian rules footballer who played for and coached Fitzroy in the Victorian Football League (VFL) during the 1920s.

== Early life ==
Ringrose was also an exceptional soccer player when he was a teenager, living in Tasmania.

== Career ==
Ringrose played with West Melbourne Football Club in 1920, before moving to Brighton in 1921.

In 1922, Ringrose was captain-coach of the Benalla in the Ovens & Murray Football League and was a great acquisition to the club, leading them to fourth position, where they lost the first semi final to Wangaratta.

Ringrose won Brighton's Most Consistent Player award in 1927 when they finished runners up in the VFA Grand Final.

Ringrose, who came from Brighton in 1928, was a handy player for Fitzroy in his two seasons, averaging almost a goal a game. He spent the majority of the 1929 season as playing coach of Fitzroy, with the club managing just two wins.

In 1930, Ringrose coached East Albury in the Ovens & Murray Football League to the Preliminary Final, losing to Wangaratta and breaking his collarbone.

Ringrose trained with Brighton in early 1931 and was also listed as an official Victorian Football League umpire in 1931.

Ringrose was captain-coach of the Yarram Football Club in the Gippsland Football League in 1932 and 1933. Ringrose kicked 31 goals in 1933. Ringrose did not coach Yarram in 1934, but continued to play.

== Links ==
- Doug Ringrose's playing statistics from AFL Tables
- Holmesby, Russell and Main, Jim (2007). The Encyclopedia of AFL Footballers. 7th ed. Melbourne: Bas Publishing.
- 1930 - East Albury FC team photo
- 1934 - Yarram FC team photo
