= James Garton =

English footballer

Personal information
- Date of birth: 1887
- Position: Forward

Senior career*
Years	Team	Apps	(Gls)
- Kettering Town
1906–1907	Bradford City	11	(1)
- * Club domestic league appearances and goals

James Garton (born 1887) was an English professional footballer who played as a forward.

== Career ==
Garton played for Kettering Town and Bradford City.

For Bradford City he made 11 appearances in the Football League.

== Sources ==
- Frost, Terry (1988). Bradford City A Complete Record 1903-1988. Breedon Books Sport. ISBN 0-907969-38-0.
