= Bob Hempel =

Australian rules footballer

Personal information
- Full name: Robert William Hempel
- Born: 9 November 1936 (age 89)
- Original team: Yarraville
- Height: 180 cm (5 ft 11 in)
- Weight: 70 kg (154 lb)

Playing career^{1}
Years	Club	Games (Goals)
1955-57	Yarraville (VFA)	10 (14)
1957	Footscray	2 (2)
- ^{1} Playing statistics correct to the end of 1957.

Robert William Hempel (born 9 November 1936) is a former Australian rules footballer who played with Footscray in the Victorian Football League (VFL).

After leaving Footscray, he played country football with Benalla, Euroa and Wangaratta Rovers, being selected in the Ovens & Murray League representative teams on several occasions.

In 2022 Hempel was arrested on 14 child sexual abuse charges. He pleaded guilty to seven charges of child abuse of a boy under 16. On 3 June 2026 Hempel was sentenced to 3 years imprisonment to serve 6 months in custody with the remaining 2 years 6 months suspended.
