= Charles Waddington (East India Company officer) =

British major-general (1796–1858)

Charles Waddington CB (24 October 1796 – 22 November 1858) was a major-general in the Bombay Engineers of the British East India Company.

== Family and education ==
Charles Waddington was born at 124 Sloane Street, Brompton, London, on 24 October 1796. He was the fifth son of William Waddington of Walkeringham, Nottinghamshire, by his wife, Grace Valentine, daughter of Henry Sykes of London. He was educated at the East India Company's Addiscombe Military Seminary from 1811 to 1812.

== Career ==
Waddington received his commission as a second lieutenant in the Bombay Engineers on 3 April 1813, and arrived in India on 22 May 1814. He accompanied Colonel Kennedy's force to the Concan, and his services at the assaults of Madanghar (eighty miles south-east of Bombay) and of Jamba were favourably mentioned. Towards the end of 1819 he went home on leave, was promoted to be lieutenant on 16 November 1820, married in 1822, and on his return to India in 1823 acted as executive engineer at Baroda. He was promoted to captain on 29 July 1825, and appointed in October executive engineer of the Baroda subsidiary force. In November 1827 he was moved to Bombay as civil engineer at the presidency, and in August 1828 acted also as superintending engineer. He was appointed to the command of the engineer corps and to take charge of the Engineer Institution in October 1830. In September 1834 he commanded the engineers at Sirur, returning to the presidency as superintending engineer in January 1835.

On 28 June 1838 Waddington was promoted to be major, and in May of the following year was appointed superintending engineer of the southern provinces. In September 1841 he went to Sind as commanding engineer. He accompanied Major-General Richard England in his march through the Bolan Pass in the autumn of 1842, and was mentioned in England's dispatch of 10 October 1842 for his services at Haikalzai. On 4 November 1842 he was appointed command engineer in Baluchistan as well as Sind. He accompanied Sir Charles Napier as commanding engineer of his force in the celebrated march of eighty-two miles from Dijikote on 6 January 1843 to Imamghar, where they arrived on 12 January. Instructed to demolish the fort, Wadding fired his mines on 15 January. He himself lit the fuses of three mines, and was bending over the train of one when his assistant called upon him to run as the other mines were about to explode.

Waddington took part in the Battle of Miani on 17 February 1843, where he acted as aide-de-camp to Napier and was mentioned in dispatches. He was also at the Battle of Hyderabad, or Dubba, on 24 March, when Napier again mentioned him as having "rendered the most important aid in examining the enemy's position with that cool courage which he possesses in so eminent degree". On 4 July he received the medal for Miani and Hyderabad and was appointed a Commander of the military division of the Order of the Bath and also promoted to lieutenant-colonel.

After a period of leave in England, Waddington was employed in special duty at Puna until October 1847, where he was appointed superintending and executive engineer at Aden, altered to chief engineer in April 1851, the court of directors desiring that 'their high approbation of his valuable services be conveyed to this zealous and able officer' (30 July 1851). He was promoted to colonel on 24 November 1853 and major-general on 28 November 1854. On 4 May 1854 he was appointed chief engineer in the public works department, Bombay, and his services in making the preparation for the Persian expedition received official acknowledgement on 3 December 1856. In November 1857 Waddington was appointed to the command in Sind. In September 1858 he was compelled by ill-health to leave India, and he died in London on 22 November of that year.

== Personal life ==
In 1822 Waddington married Anne Rebecca, daughter of John Pinchard of Taunton, Somerset; and by her he left a family of six sons and two daughters. His eldest son, William (b. 1823), colonel Bombay Staff Corps, served in Persia (medal and clasp) 1856–1857, and became J.P. for Wiltshire. Another son, Thomas (b. 1827), became major-general of the Bombay Staff Corps. He married in 1862 Emilie Helena Willoughby, daughter of Major-General Michael Francklin Willoughby.

== Publications ==
Waddington contributed several papers to the Professional Papers of the Corps of Royal Engineers, including:

- "Account of the Battle of Meanee" (vol. 9)
- "Doctrines of Carpentry in their Application to the Construction of Roofs" (vol. 10)
