= Cec Garton =

Australian rules footballer

Personal information
- Full name: Cecil Harold Vaughan Garton
- Born: 1 December 1874; Hamilton, Victoria
- Died: 27 February 1908 (aged 33); Fitzroy North, Victoria
- Original team: Benalla

Playing career^{1}
Years	Club	Games (Goals)
1906	Essendon	1 (0)
- ^{1} Playing statistics correct to the end of 1906.

Cecil Harold Vaughan Garton (1 December 1874 – 27 February 1908) was an Australian rules footballer who played one game with Essendon in the Victorian Football League (VFL).
