= John Waddington (Australian rules footballer) =

Australian rules footballer (1938–2019)

Personal information
- Full name: John Waddington
- Born: 24 May 1938
- Died: 6 July 2019 (aged 81)
- Original team: South Bendigo
- Height: 183 cm (6 ft 0 in)
- Weight: 80 kg (176 lb)
- Position: Centre Half Back

Playing career^{1}
Years	Club	Games (Goals)
1958–1966	North Melbourne	132 (30)
- ^{1} Playing statistics correct to the end of 1966.

John Waddington (24 May 1938 – 6 July 2019) was an Australian rules footballer who played with North Melbourne in the Victorian Football League (VFL).

Waddington, a half forward, grew up in Bendigo, and played for South Bendigo. He topped the Bendigo Football League goal-kicking in 1957, winning the Bob Chappell Medal with 72 goals.

The following year he arrived at North Melbourne and played all possible 20 games in his debut season. This included their four-point semi final win over Fitzroy, in which he contributed three goals.

He remained a regular fixture in the team for the next eight years, mostly as a defender. It was as a centre half-back that he was selected for the Victorian interstate side in 1964.

At the end of the 1966 season he left North Melbourne to become senior captain-coach of Benalla in the Ovens & Murray Football League. He won the 1968 Ovens & Murray Football League Morris Medal.

He was later playing coach of Morningside in Brisbane, Queensland. He also coached Gold Coast team, Palm Beach Currumbin.

== Links ==
- John Waddington Profile at Demonwiki
