= John Waddington (South African cricketer) =

South African cricketer

Personal information
- Full name: John Edward Waddington
- Born: 30 December 1918; Kimberley, Cape Province, South Africa
- Died: 24 November 1985 (aged 66); Kimberley, Cape Province, South Africa
- Batting: Right-handed
- Bowling: Right-arm medium

Domestic team information
- Years: Team
- 1934–35 to 1958–59: Griqualand West

Career statistics
Competition	First-class
Matches	83
Runs scored	1625
Batting average	16.25
100s/50s	0/1
Top score	72
Balls bowled	24364
Wickets	375
Bowling average	24.49
5 wickets in innings	35
10 wickets in match	8
Best bowling	9–105
Catches/stumpings	59/-
- Source: Cricinfo, 4 April 2018

John Edward Waddington (30 December 1918 – 24 November 1985) was a South African first-class cricketer. He was a prolific wicket taker for Griqualand West and was the South African Cricket Annual Cricketer of the Year in 1953.

He was the second-youngest South African first-class cricketer, having made his debut for Griqualand West in 1934 at the age of 15 years 320 days. (Dudley Theophilus had been 11 days younger on his debut in 1927.) He continued playing first-class cricket until 1958–59.

In 1952–53 he set a record for the Currie Cup when he took 53 wickets in a season, at an average of 16.85, in six matches. In four consecutive matches he took 43 wickets: 7 for 65 and 6 for 39 against North-Eastern Transvaal in Pretoria, 6 for 84 and 4 for 52 against Border in Kimberley, 7 for 101 and 2 for 65 against Transvaal in Kimberley, and 6 for 98 and 5 for 72 against North-Eastern Transvaal in Kimberley. During the season he also became the first bowler to take 200 wickets in the Currie Cup. It was also his most prolific season with the bat, with 295 runs at 42.14.

He captained Griqualand West in 1949–50 and 1950–51, then from 1954–55 until his retirement. In his last match, in 1958–59, he took 8 for 64 against Orange Free State in Kimberley. His best innings figures were 9 for 105 against Eastern Province in Port Elizabeth in 1954–55.

He was selected for two matches for the South African XI against the touring Australians in 1949–50, but he never played Test cricket.
