= Waddington =

Waddington may refer to:

== Places ==
- Waddington, Lincolnshire, large village in Lincolnshire, England
- RAF Waddington, airforce station a few miles from the above village
- Waddington, Lancashire, small village in Lancashire, England
- Waddington, California, unincorporated community in Humboldt County, California, United States
- Waddington, New York, town in St. Lawrence County, New York, United States
- Waddington (village), New York, village located in the town of Waddington, New York, United States
- Waddington, New Zealand, village in Canterbury, New Zealand
- Mount Waddington, mountain in British Columbia, Canada
- Waddington Range, mountain range in British Columbia, Canada

== People ==
- Waddington (surname)

== See also ==
- Waddingtons, a British publishing company
