= John Gilding =

Australian rules footballer

Personal information
- Full name: John Foster Gilding
- Born: 4 July 1884; Benalla, Victoria
- Died: 9 November 1969 (aged 85)
- Original team: Benalla

Playing career^{1}
Years	Club	Games (Goals)
1907	St Kilda	1 (0)
- ^{1} Playing statistics correct to the end of 1907.

John Foster Gilding (4 July 1884 – 9 November 1969) was an Australian rules footballer who played with St Kilda in the Victorian Football League (VFL).

After playing a single game for St Kilda in Round 4 of the 1907 season he transferred to Richmond (then in the Victorian Football Association) in the middle of the season. He did not play a senior game for Richmond and following a move to Adelaide, he played two games for North Adelaide in the South Australian Football League in 1908.
