= Max Howell (footballer) =

Australian rules footballer

Personal information
- Full name: Maxwell Herbert Howell
- Born: 26 December 1927
- Died: 3 October 2012 (aged 84)
- Original team: Benalla
- Height: 175 cm (5 ft 9 in)
- Weight: 74.5 kg (164 lb)

Playing career^{1}
Years	Club	Games (Goals)
1948–50	Carlton	12 (1)
- ^{1} Playing statistics correct to the end of 1950.

Maxwell Herbert Howell (26 December 1927 – 3 October 2012) was an Australian rules footballer who played with Carlton in the Victorian Football League (VFL).
