= Lester State Forest =

State forest in New South Wales, Australia

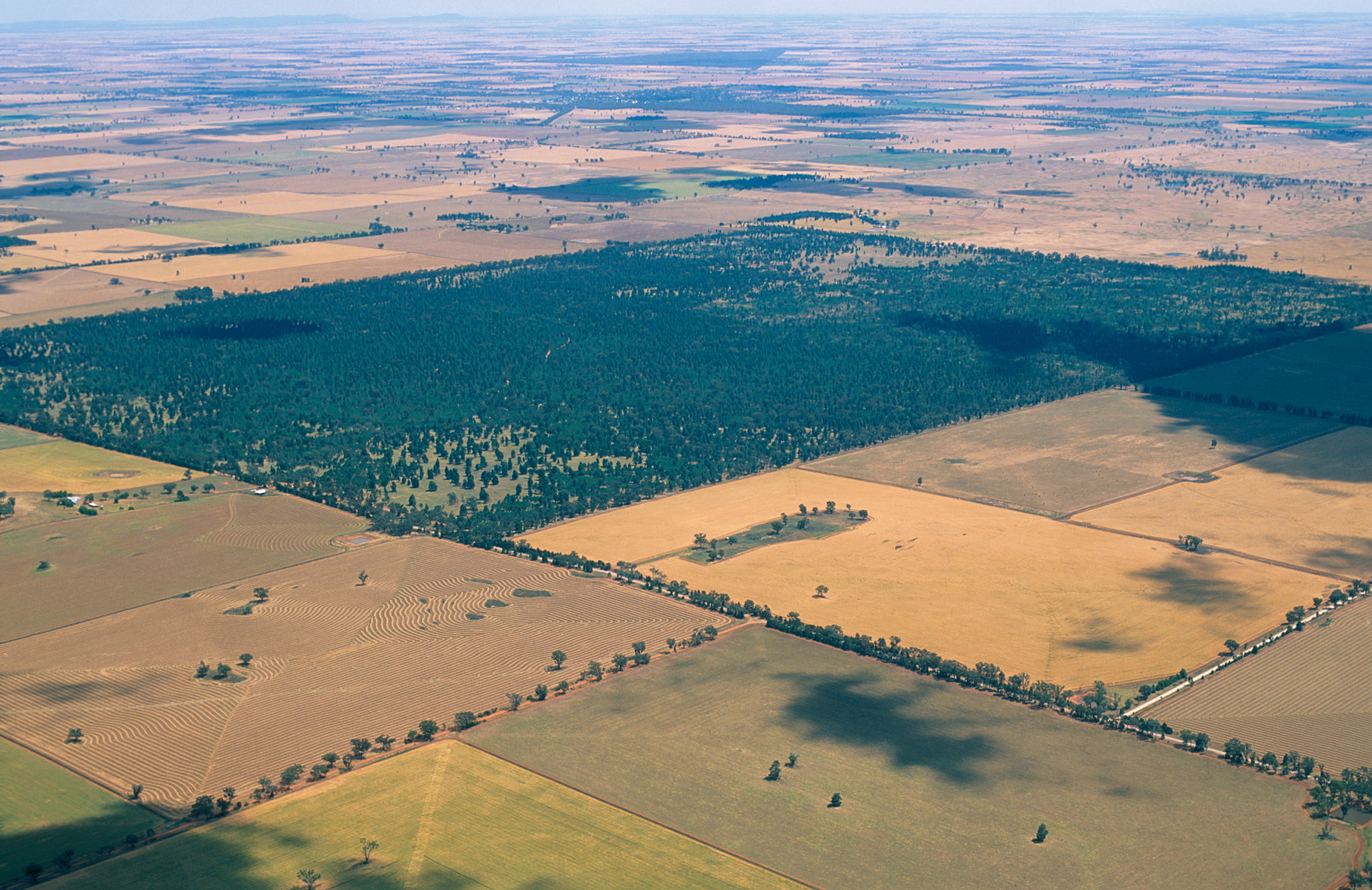
- Aerial view of Lester State Forest, 1999
- Interactive map of Lester State Forest

Geography
- Location: South Western Slopes, New South Wales, Australia
- Coordinates: 34°52′08″S 147°06′29″E
- Elevation: 210 metres (690 ft) - 250 metres (820 ft)
- Area: 790 ha (7.9 km^{2}; 3.1 mi^{2})

Administration
- Authority: Forestry Corporation of NSW

Ecology
- Dominant tree species: White cypress pine
- Lesser flora: Grey box, yellow box, Blakely's red gum, river red gum, bulloak, river she-oak

Lester State Forest is a native forest, located in the South Western Slopes region of New South Wales, in eastern Australia. The 790 ha (2,000-acre) state forest is located approximately 8 km (5.0 mi) south-west of Coolamon, New South Wales.

== Environment ==
=== Flora ===
167 plant species have been recorded within the state forest, of which 104 were native, and 63 were introduced. The state forest is dominated by white cypress pine. Other large tree species present within the forest include white box, grey box, yellow box, kurrajong and bulloak.

Native plant species recorded within the state forest include nardoo, rock fern, small vanilla lily, bulbine lily, early nancy, dusky fingers, common onion orchid, purple burr-daisy, climbing saltbush, showy wattle, woolly wattle, mallee wattle, golden wattle, hooked needlewood and creamy candles.

=== Fauna ===
At least 9 fauna species listed under the Biodiversity Conservation Act 2016 have been recorded within the state forest. This includes several bird species, such as the brown treecreeper, diamond firetail, grey-crowned babbler and little eagle.

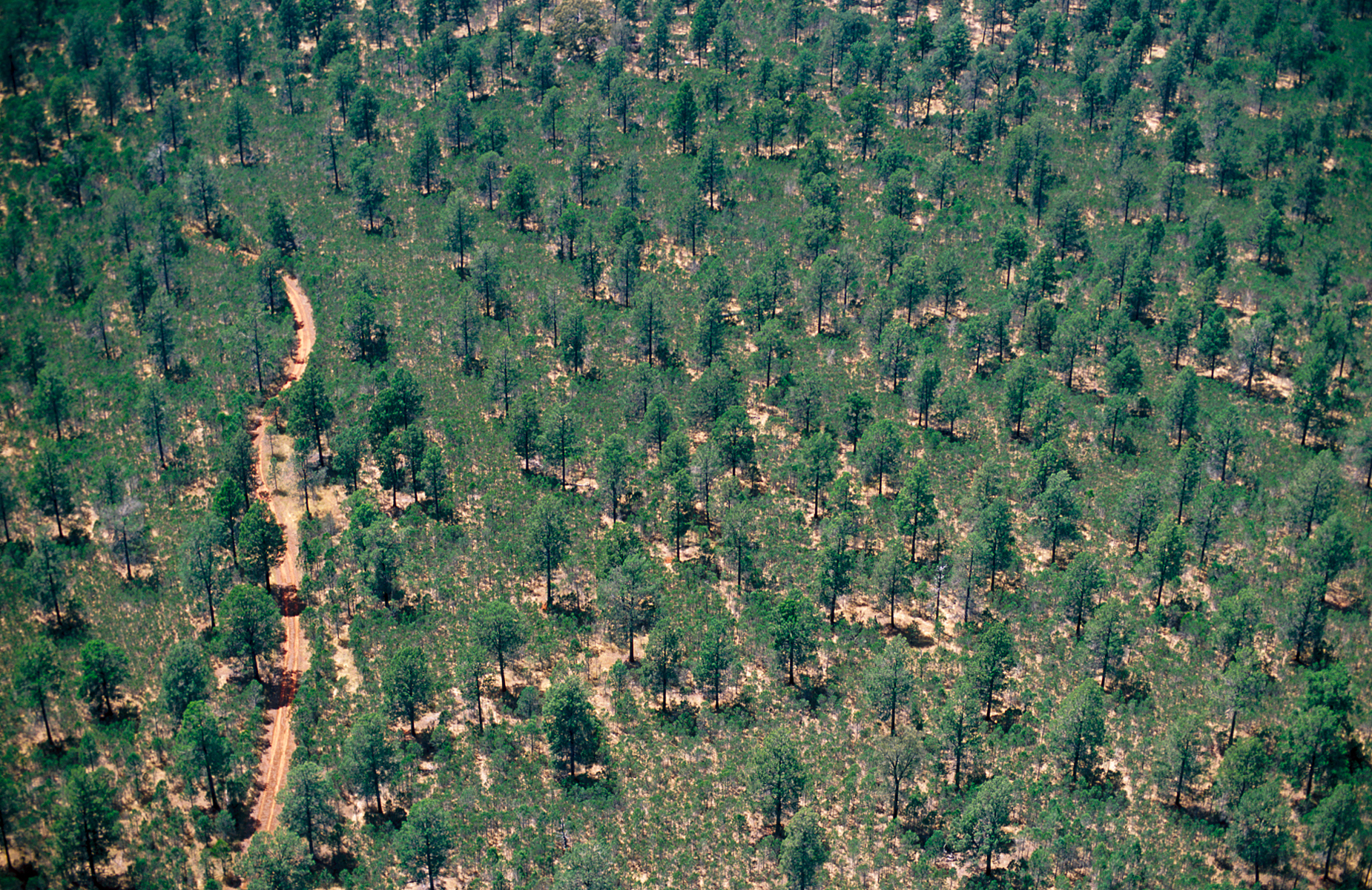
Aerial view of white cypress pines in Lester State Forest, 1999

== See also ==
- State Forests of New South Wales
