= Kindra State Forest =

Forest in New South Wales, Australia

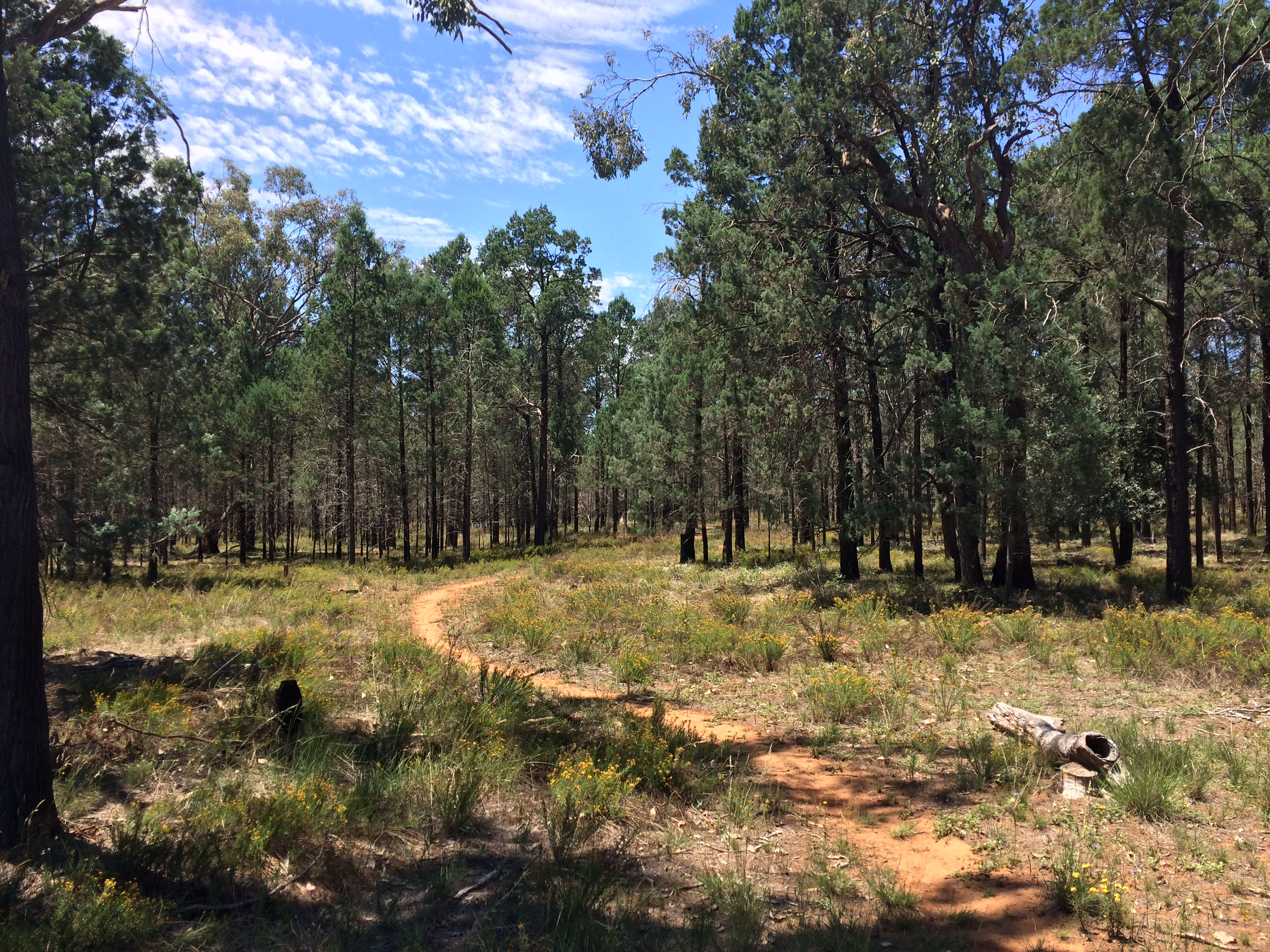
- Interactive map of Kindra State Forest

Geography
- Location: New South Wales, Riverina, Australia
- Coordinates: 34°48′17″S 147°12′17″E
- Elevation: 220 metres (720 ft) - 240 metres (790 ft)
- Area: 520 hectares (5.2 km^{2}; 2.0 mi^{2})

Administration
- Established: 1974
- Authority: Forestry Corporation of NSW

Ecology
- Dominant tree species: White cypress pine, grey box

Kindra State Forest is a native forest, in the Australian state of New South Wales with a total area of about 520 hectares. It is located at Coolamon, New South Wales.

The state forest contains bike and walking trails. In November 2022, it was announced as a finalist in the Keep Australia Beautiful Awards.

== Environment ==
=== Flora ===
145 plant species have been recorded within the state forest, of which 99 were native, and 46 were introduced. The state forest is dominated by white cypress pine. Other large tree species present within the forest include white box, grey box, yellow box, river red gum and bulloak.

Native plant species recorded within the state forest include nardoo, rock fern, small vanilla lily, bulbine lily, early nancy, dusky fingers, waxlip orchid, purple burr-daisy, creeping saltbush, climbing saltbush, showy parrot-pea, green wattle, mallee wattle, kangaroo thorn, weeping pittosporum, wedge-leaf hop-bush and creamy candles.

=== Fauna ===
At least 7 bird species listed under the Biodiversity Conservation Act 2016 have been recorded within the state forest, including brown treecreeper, flame robin, grey-crowned babbler, hooded robin, little eagle and speckled warbler. Other bird species found in the state forest include white-browed babbler, white-browed woodswallow, masked woodswallow, dusky woodswallow, red-capped robin, eastern rosella, red-rumped parrot, and southern whiteface.

== Gallery ==
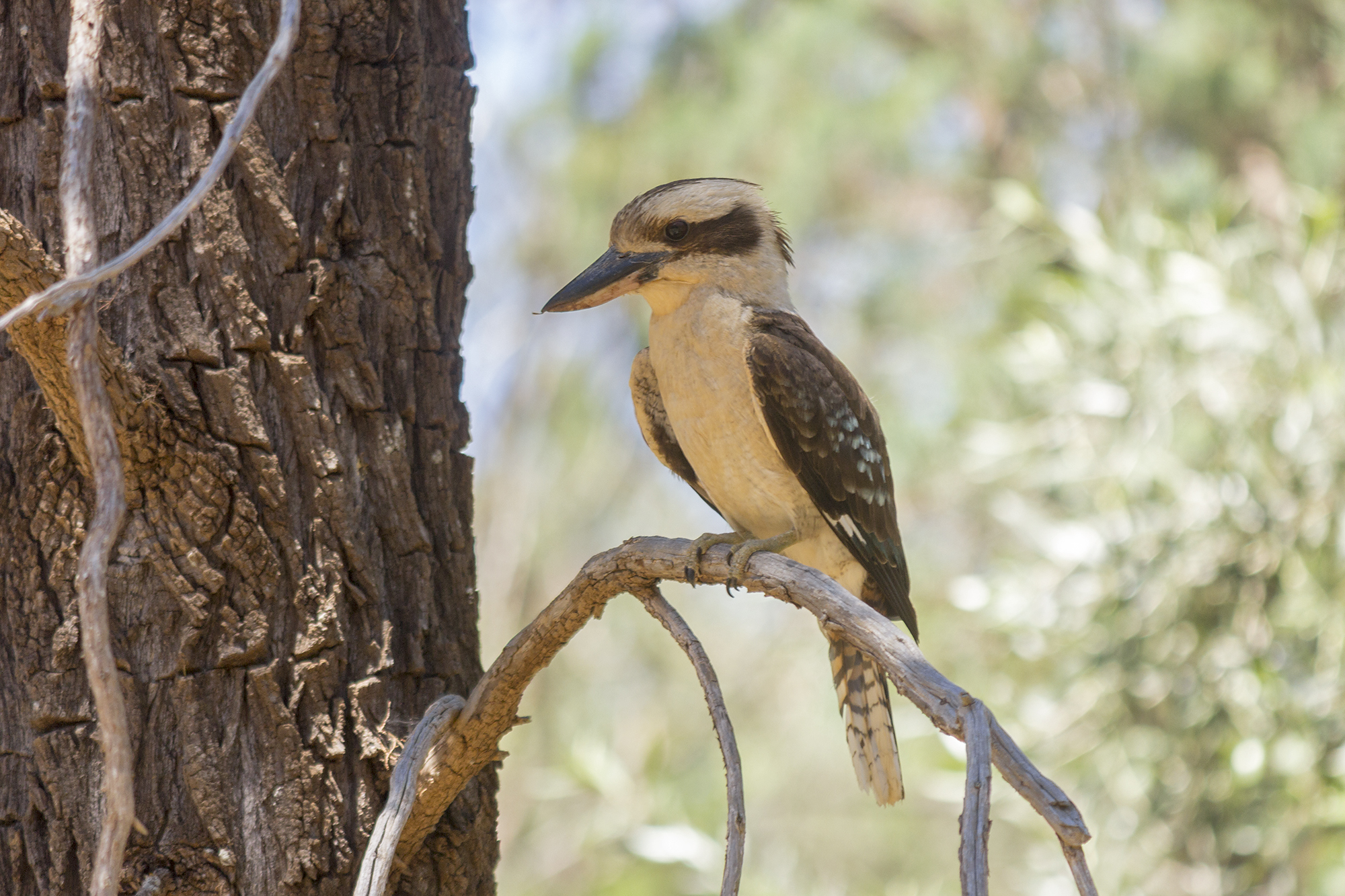
Laughing kookaburra, Kindra State Forest

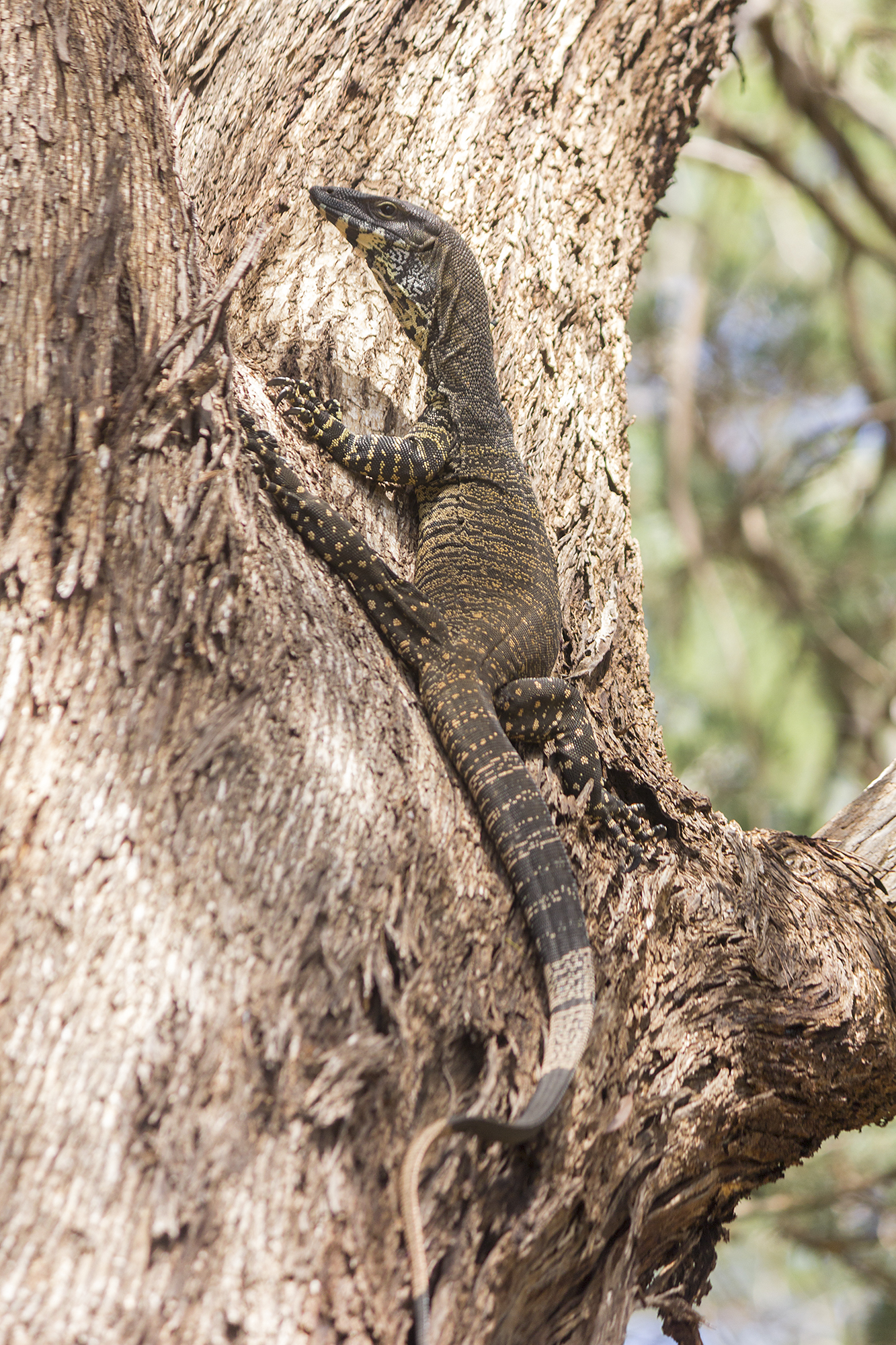
Lace monitor, Kindra State Forest

== See also ==
- State Forests of New South Wales
