= Brookong State Forest =

State forest in New South Wales, Australia

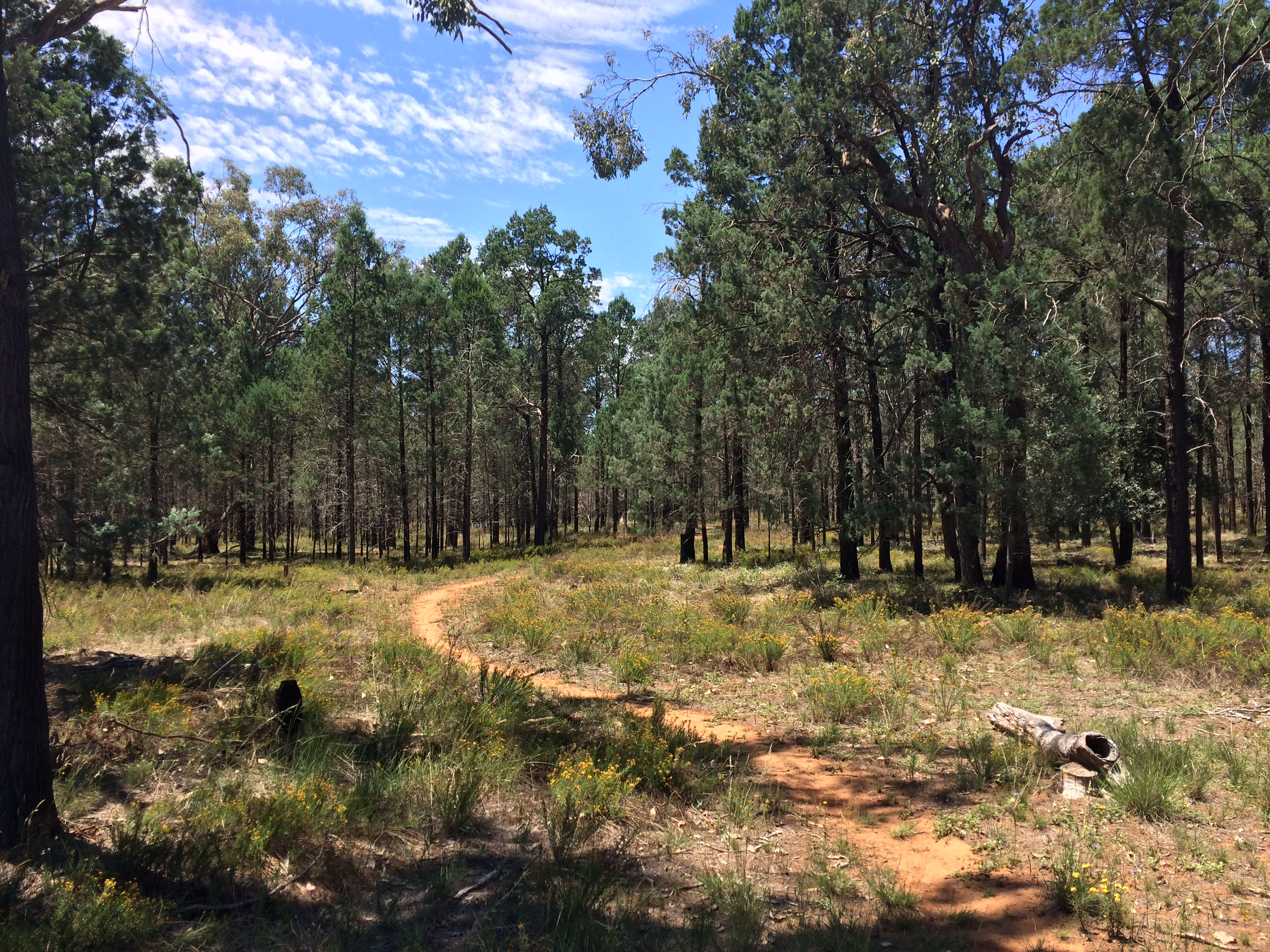
- White cypress pine forest
- Interactive map of Brookong State Forest

Geography
- Location: South Western Slopes, New South Wales, Australia
- Coordinates: 35°14′38″S 146°39′13″E
- Elevation: 150 metres (490 ft) - 180 metres (590 ft)
- Area: 346 ha (3.5 km^{2}; 1.3 mi^{2})

Administration
- Authority: Forestry Corporation of NSW

Ecology
- Dominant tree species: White cypress pine
- Lesser flora: Grey box, yellow box, Blakely's red gum, bulloak, kurrajong

Brookong State Forest is a native forest, located in the South Western Slopes region of New South Wales, in eastern Australia. The 346 ha (850-acre) state forest is located approximately 4 km (2.5 mi) south-west of Lockhart.

== Environment ==
=== Flora ===
112 plant species have been recorded within the state forest, of which 78 were native, and 34 were introduced. The state forest is dominated by white cypress pine. Other large tree species present within the forest include grey box, yellow box, Blakely's red gum, bulloak, kurrajong and weeping myall.

Native plant species recorded within the state forest include rock fern, small vanilla lily, bulbine lily, early nancy, dusky fingers, purple burr-daisy, creeping saltbush, climbing saltbush, showy parrot-pea, green wattle, mallee wattle, golden wattle, wedge-leaf hop-bush and creamy candles.

=== Fauna ===
At least six bird species listed under the Biodiversity Conservation Act 2016 have been recorded within the state forest, including diamond firetail, grey-crowned babbler, little eagle and scarlet robin. Other birds found in the reserve include red-rumped parrot, red-capped robin, and Australian raven.

== See also ==
- State Forests of New South Wales
