= Kockibitoo State Forest =

State forest in New South Wales, Australia

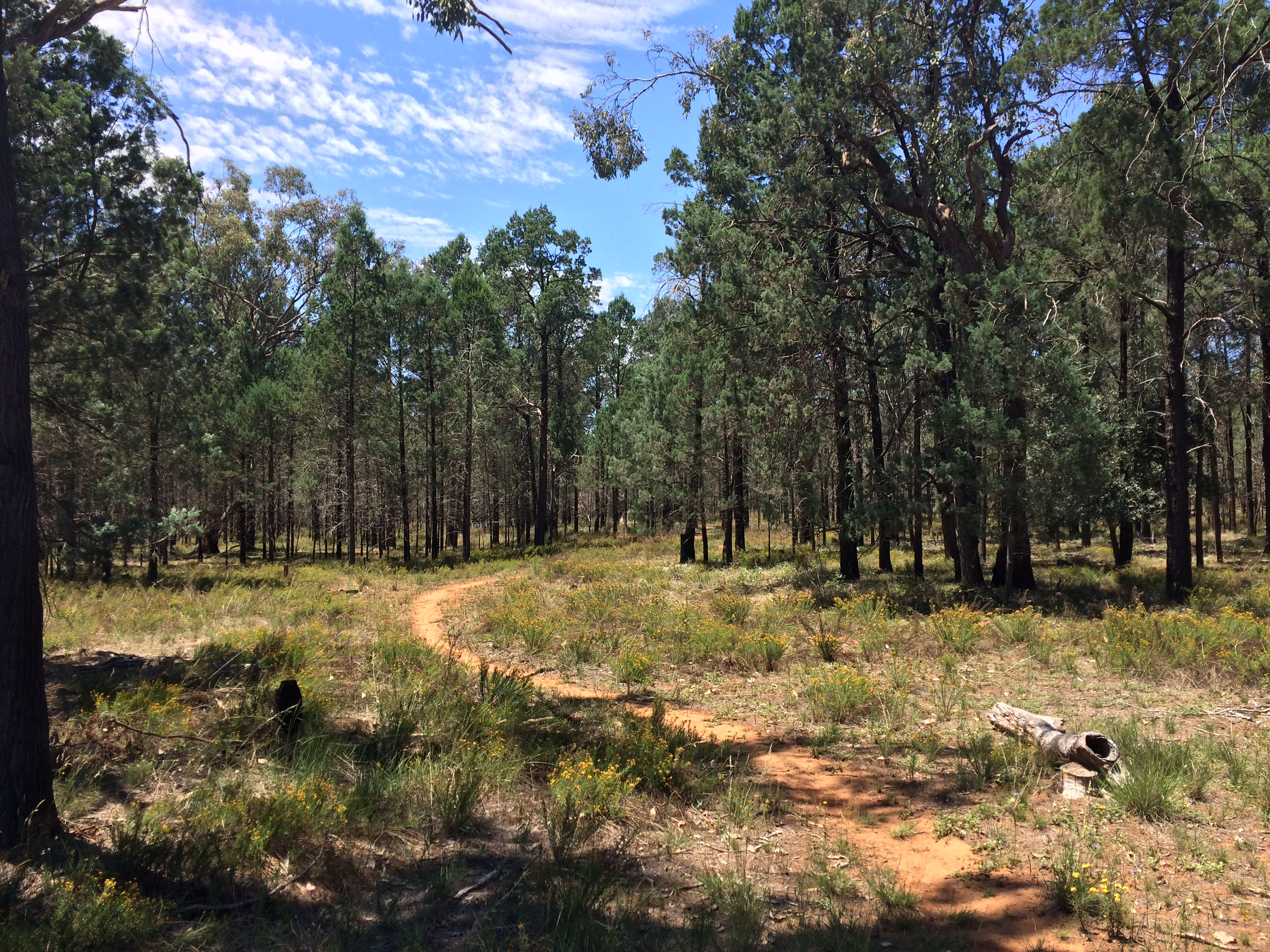
- White cypress pine forest
- Interactive map of Kockibitoo State Forest

Geography
- Location: South Western Slopes, New South Wales, Australia
- Coordinates: 34°56′05″S 146°58′20″E
- Elevation: 160 metres (520 ft) - 170 metres (560 ft)
- Area: 244 ha (2.4 km^{2}; 0.9 mi^{2})

Administration
- Authority: Forestry Corporation of NSW

Ecology
- Dominant tree species: White cypress pine
- Lesser flora: Grey box, bulloak

Kockibitoo State Forest is a native forest, located in the South Western Slopes region of New South Wales, in eastern Australia. The 244 ha (600-acre) state forest is located approximately 25 km (16 mi) south-west of Coolamon, and 40 km (25 mi) north-west of Wagga Wagga.

== Environment ==
=== Flora ===
117 plant species have been recorded within the state forest, of which 75 were native, and 42 were introduced. The state forest is dominated by white cypress pine. Other large tree species present within the forest include grey box and bulloak.

Native plant species recorded within the state forest include nardoo, rock fern, small vanilla lily, bulbine lily, early nancy, common onion orchid, purple burr-daisy, climbing saltbush, twining glycine, grey mulga, showy wattle, mallee wattle, wedge-leaf hop-bush and creamy candles.

=== Fauna ===
At least 10 species listed under the Biodiversity Conservation Act 2016 have been recorded within the state forest, including flame robin and scarlet robin.

== See also ==
- State Forests of New South Wales
