= Currawananna State Forest =

State forest in New South Wales, Australia

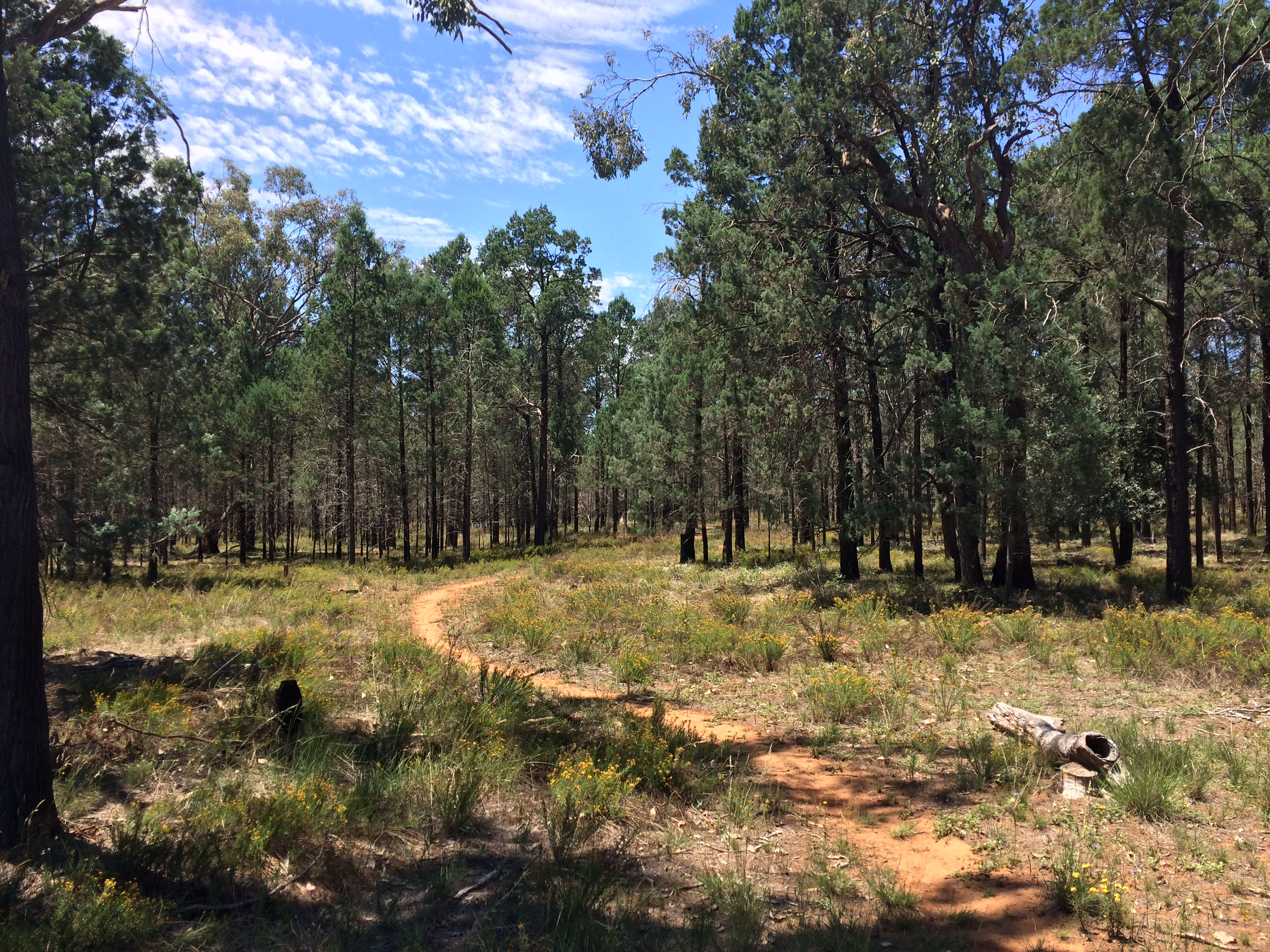
- White cypress pine forest
- Interactive map of Currawananna State Forest

Geography
- Location: South Western Slopes, New South Wales, Australia
- Coordinates: 35°00′28″S 147°03′26″E
- Elevation: 165 metres (541 ft) - 190 metres (620 ft)
- Area: 286 ha (2.9 km^{2}; 1.1 mi^{2})

Administration
- Authority: Forestry Corporation of NSW

Ecology
- Dominant tree species: White cypress pine
- Lesser flora: Grey box, yellow box, Blakely's red gum, river red gum, bulloak, river she-oak

Currawananna State Forest is a native forest, located in the South Western Slopes region of New South Wales, in eastern Australia. The 286 ha (710-acre) state forest is located approximately 30 km (19 mi) north-west of Wagga Wagga.

== Environment ==
=== Flora ===
184 plant species have been recorded within the state forest, of which 95 were native, and 89 were introduced. At least 36 percent of the forest within the state forest is dominated by white cypress pine. Other large tree species present within the forest include grey box, yellow box, Blakely's red gum, river red gum, bulloak and river she-oak.

Native plant species recorded within the state forest include nardoo, rock fern, small vanilla lily, bulbine lily, early nancy, common onion orchid, purple burr-daisy, creeping saltbush, climbing saltbush, grey mulga, green wattle, mallee wattle, hooked needlewood and creamy candles.

=== Fauna ===
==== Mammals ====
28 mammal species have been recorded within the state forest, including short-beaked echidna, squirrel glider, common ringtail possum, common brushtail possum, eastern grey kangaroo, yellow-bellied sheath-tailed bat, southern myotis, chocolate wattled bat, Gould's long-eared bat and rakali.

==== Birds ====
114 bird species have been recorded within the state forest, including peaceful dove, square-tailed kite, little eagle, superb parrot, yellow rosella, Australian boobook, brown treecreeper, speckled warbler, southern whiteface, grey-crowned babbler, varied sitella, dusky woodswallow, grey fantail, flame robin, silvereye and diamond firetail.

==== Reptiles ====
13 reptile species have been recorded within the state forest, including marbled gecko, Boulenger's skink, blue-tongued lizard, eastern bearded dragon, sand goanna, yellow-faced whipsnake and bandy-bandy.

==== Amphibians ====
7 amphibian species have been recorded within the state forest, including Peron's tree frog, eastern sign-bearing froglet, barking marsh frog, giant banjo frog, spotted marsh frog, Sudell's frog and wrinkled toadlet.

== See also ==
- State Forests of New South Wales
