= Matong State Forest =

State forest in New South Wales, Australia

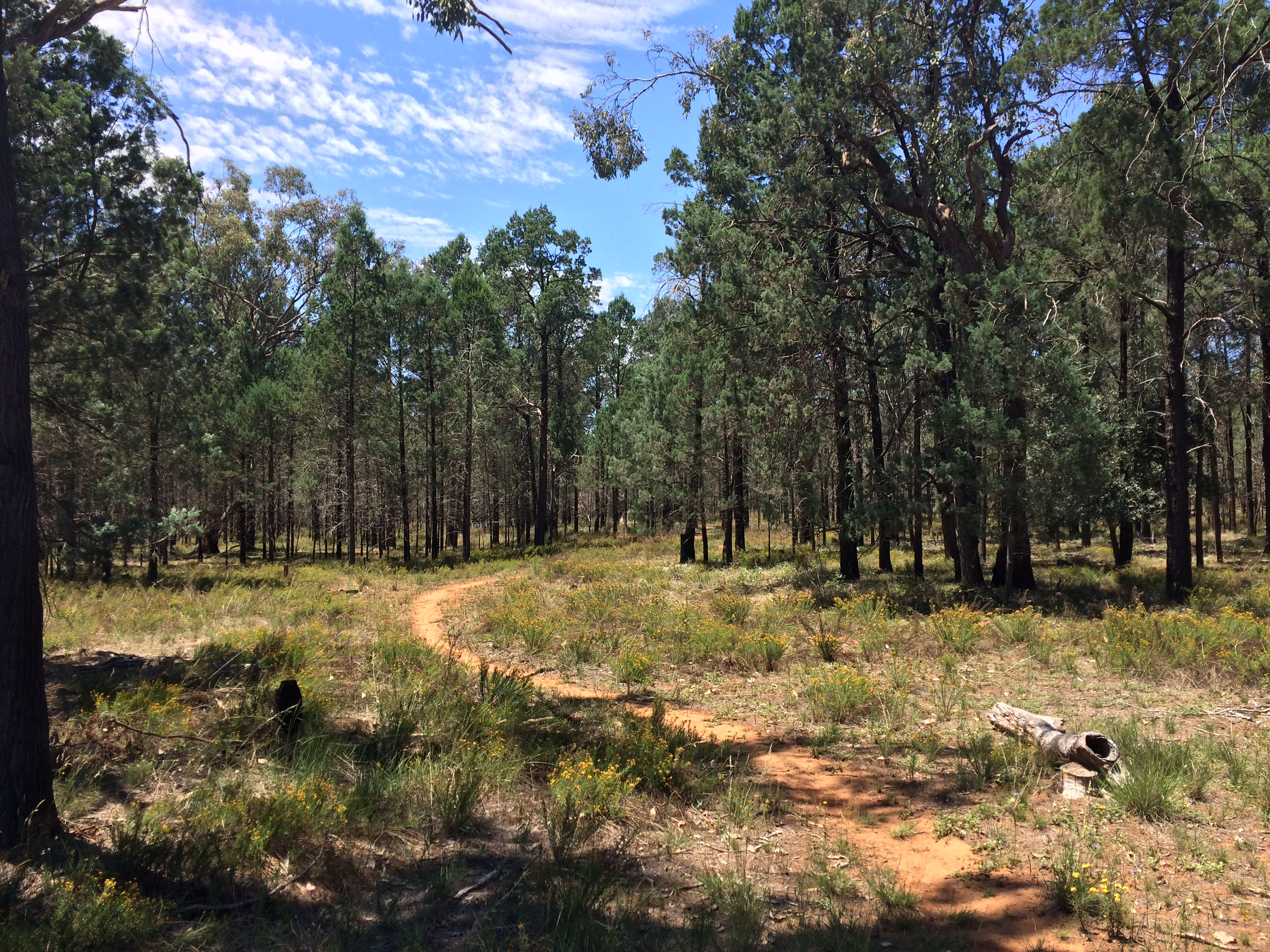
- White cypress pine forest
- Interactive map of Matong State Forest

Geography
- Location: South Western Slopes, New South Wales, Australia
- Coordinates: 34°50′58″S 146°55′27″E
- Elevation: 160 metres (520 ft) - 170 metres (560 ft)
- Area: 3,177 ha (31.8 km^{2}; 12.3 mi^{2})

Administration
- Authority: Forestry Corporation of NSW

Ecology
- Dominant tree species: White cypress pine
- Lesser flora: Grey box, yellow box, river red gum, bulloak

Matong State Forest is a native forest, located in the South Western Slopes region of New South Wales, in eastern Australia. The 3,177 ha (7,850-acre) state forest is located approximately 6 km (3.7 mi) south of Matong, and 30 km (19 mi) south-east of Narrandera.

The Burning Seed Festival, an annual regional Burning Man event, has been held at the state forest since 2011.

== Etymology ==
The place name Matong is derived from a local Aboriginal word meaning 'strong' or 'great'.

== Environment ==
=== Flora ===
221 plant species have been recorded within the state forest, of which 135 were native, and 86 were introduced. At least 94 percent of the forest within the state forest is dominated by white cypress pine. Other large tree species present within the forest include grey box, yellow box, river red gum and bulloak.

Native plant species recorded within the state forest include nardoo, rock fern, small vanilla lily, bulbine lily, early nancy, dusky fingers, common onion orchid, purple burr-daisy, climbing saltbush, twining glycine, showy wattle, mallee wattle, hakea wattle, wedge-leaf hop-bush and creamy candles.

=== Fauna ===
At least 10 species listed under the Biodiversity Conservation Act 2016 have been recorded within the state forest, including brown treecreeper, diamond firetail, grey-crowned babbler and spotted harrier. Other birds recorded in the state forest include rufous whistler and peaceful dove.

== See also ==
- State Forests of New South Wales
