= Ringwood Tank State Forest =

State forest in New South Wales, Australia

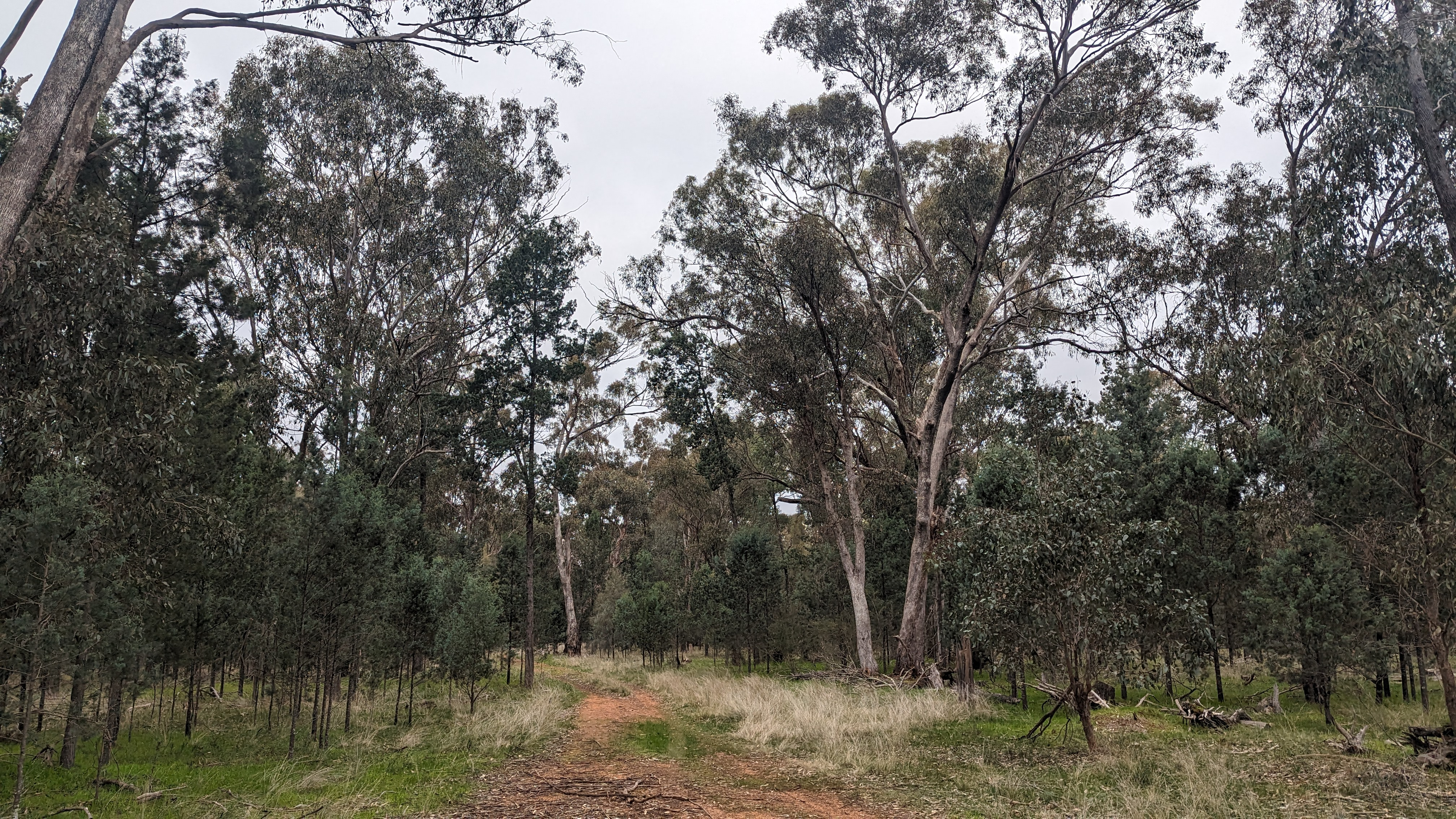
- Interactive map of Ringwood Tank State Forest

Geography
- Location: South Western Slopes, New South Wales, Australia
- Coordinates: 35°55′21″S 146°16′48″E
- Area: 231 ha (2.3 km^{2}; 0.9 mi^{2})

Administration
- Authority: Forestry Corporation of NSW

Ecology
- Dominant tree species: White cypress pine
- Lesser flora: Grey box

Ringwood Tank State Forest is a native forest, located in the South Western Slopes region of New South Wales, in eastern Australia. The 231 ha (570-acre) state forest is located approximately 12 km (7.5 mi) north-west of Corowa.

== Etymology ==
The place name Ringwood Tank is derived from the dam located in the northern section of the reserve.

== Environment ==
Ringwood Tank State Forest is dominated by white cypress pine. Other plant species present within the forest include grey box and bulloak.

At least six species listed under the Biodiversity Conservation Act 2016 have been recorded within the state forest, including squirrel glider, brolga, brown treecreeper, grey-crowned babbler, hooded robin, and varied sittella.

== See also ==
- State Forests of New South Wales
