= South West Woodland Nature Reserve =

Protected area in New South Wales, Australia

- IUCN category Ia (strict nature reserve)
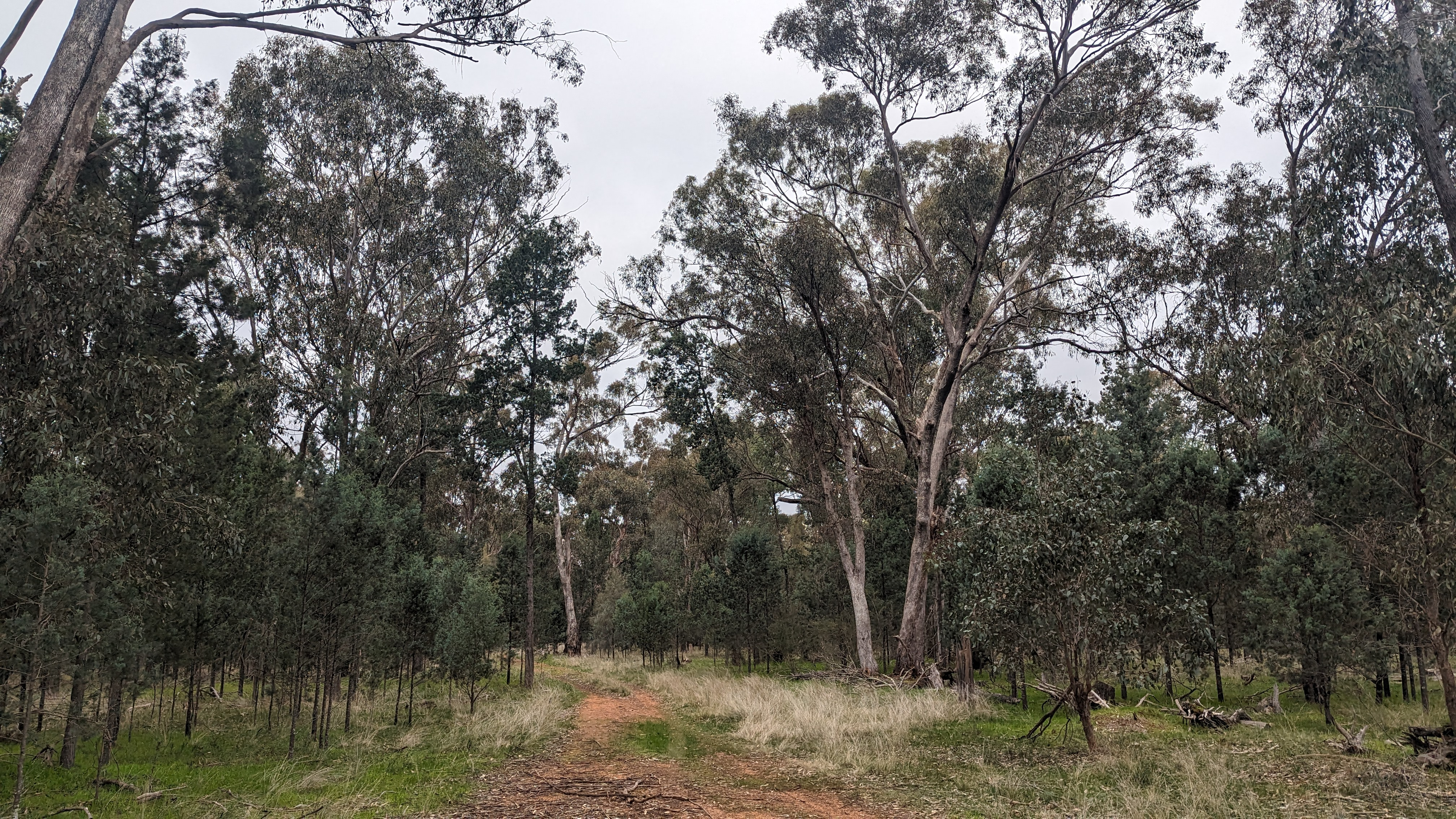

- Location within New South Wales
- Location: New South Wales
- Coordinates: 33°03′53″S 148°42′54.9″E
- Area: 138.4 km^{2} (53.4 sq mi)
- Established: 1 January 2011
- Governing body: NSW National Parks & Wildlife Service
- Website: Official website

South West Woodland Nature Reserve is a protected nature reserve, located in the South Western Slopes, Riverina, and Murray Darling Depression regions of New South Wales, in eastern Australia. The 13,840 ha (34,200-acre) reserve consists of 27 separate precincts spread from Peak Hill in the north to Berrigan in the south, a distance of approximately 400 km (250 mi).

== History ==
The reserve lies within Wiradjuri and Ngiyampaa country. Some parts of the reserve have been surveyed and have registered Aboriginal sites, however further study and engagement with Aboriginal communities is required to fully understand its historic significance to Aboriginal people.

South West Woodland Nature Reserve was reserved as part of the National Park Estate (South Western Cypress Reservations) Act (2010). Prior to reservation the various precincts were state forests, with the previous state forest names continuing to be used for each precinct.

The various precincts of the reserve were gazetted as State Forests between 1913 and 1977 and managed by the Forestry Commission of NSW for logging and timber harvesting activities. The state forests were reclassified as a nature reserve on 1 January 2011.

State Forests incorporated into the South West Woodland Nature Reserve
Order	Name	Area		Gazetted as a state forest	LGA	Location
Order	Name	ha	acre	Gazetted as a state forest	LGA	Location
1	Banandra*	194	480	18 February 1914	Murrumbidgee, Narrandera	34°42′46.4″S 146°13′19″E
2	Berrigan	307	760	23 March 1917	Berrigan	35°41′06.5″S 145°55′50.2″E
3	Blow Clear	127	310	20 October 1916	Bland	33°44′47.5″S 147°14′47.1″E
4	Blow Clear West^{†}	1,442	3,560	2 March 1917	Parkes	32°59′21.4″S 147°51′34.4″E
5	Blue Mallee	283	700	3 May 1957	Bland	33°55′21.6″S 147°06′09.9″E
6	Booroorban	1,402	3,460	2 March 1917	Edward River	34°56′55.6″S 144°49′41.5″E
7	Buddigower	423	1,050	16 August 1940	Bland	34°03′35.8″S 147°06′00.9″E
8	Buggajool	381	940	5 January 1917	Bland	34°10′32.6″S 147°13′20.4″E
9	Cadow	53	130	2 March 1917	Lachlan	33°16′07.5″S 147°27′05.7″E
10	Cookamidgera	547	1,350	10 December 1913	Forbes	33°13′57″S 148°16′21.8″E
11	Coradgery	765	1,890	3 November 1916	Parkes	32°48′49.9″S 147°56′07.9″E
12	Edgar	593	1,470	10 February 1915	Edward River	35°05′02.2″S 145°16′38″E
13	Goolgowi	101	250	5 September 1958	Carrathool	33°59′18″S 145°46′09.1″E
14	Hiawatha	778	1,920	28 January 1915	Bland	33°50′22.6″S 147°13′19.6″E
15	Killonbutta	1,515	3,740	6 August 1920	Cabonne	33°03′53″S 148°42′54.9″E
16	Kulki	172	430	15 June 1917	Murrumbidgee	34°56′42.8″S 145°46′40.7″E
17	Lake Urana	219	540	20 July 1917	Federation	35°16′18.6″S 146°13′14.2″E
18	Little Blow Clear	57	140	20 October 1916	Bland	33°44′15.9″S 147°14′01.5″E
19	Mairjimmy	483	1,190	13 July 1917	Murrumbidgee	35°29′25.4″S 145°42′57.8″E
20	Mandagery	1,514	3,740	10 December 1913	Cabonne	35°29′25.4″S 145°42′57.8″E
21	Merriwagga	156	390	4 November 1977	Carrathool	33°47′50.4″S 145°38′14.5″E
22	Narraburra	63	160	17 November 1916	Temora	34°20′24.5″S 147°38′20.6″E
23	Puckawidgee	412	1,020	27 February 1917	Edward River	35°04′36.7″S 145°13′51.8″E
24	Stackpoole	751	1,860	19 November 1976	Carrathool	33°49′38.8″S 145°50′02.1″E
25	Steam Plains	308	760	9 March 1917	Edward River	35°05′33.7″S 145°18′40.2″E
26	West Cookeys Plains	625	1,540	20 October 1916	Parkes	33°02′33.8″S 147°36′57.4″E
27	Yeo Yeo	179	440	23 August 1918	Cootamundra–Gundagai	34°32′06.5″S 147°59′59.8″E
*A further 547 ha (1,350-acre) of Banandra State Forest was incorporated into Murrumbidgee Valley National Park.^{†}About 470 ha (1,200-acre) of Blow Clear West remains as State Forest.

== Environment ==
=== Flora ===
Plant communities that exist within the reserve include woodlands and forests dominated by grey box, mugga ironbark, white cypress pine, bimble box, and red mallee. Other native plant species recorded within the reserve include pine donkey orchid, Wakool spear-grass, and Inland red box.

Introduced weed species found in the reserve include African boxthorn, white horehound, prickly pear, Noogoora and Bathurst burrs, Patterson's curse, and thistles.

=== Fauna ===
Seven bird species listed under the Biodiversity Conservation Act 2016 have been recorded within the reserve, including swift parrot, little eagle, brown treecreeper, pink cockatoo, speckled warbler, grey-crowned babbler, and varied sitella. Other birds recorded in the reserve include white-browed babbler, apostlebird, superb parrot, barking owl, black-chinned honeyeater, diamond firetail, little lorikeet, hooded robin, and shy heathwren.

Mammal species listed under the Biodiversity Conservation Act 2016 which have been recorded in the reserve include yellow-bellied sheath-tailed bat and little pied bat.

Introduced pest species found within the reserve include European fox, feral pig, European rabbit, feral goat, and feral cat.

== See also ==
- Protected areas of New South Wales
