= Cullivel State Forest =

State forest in New South Wales, Australia

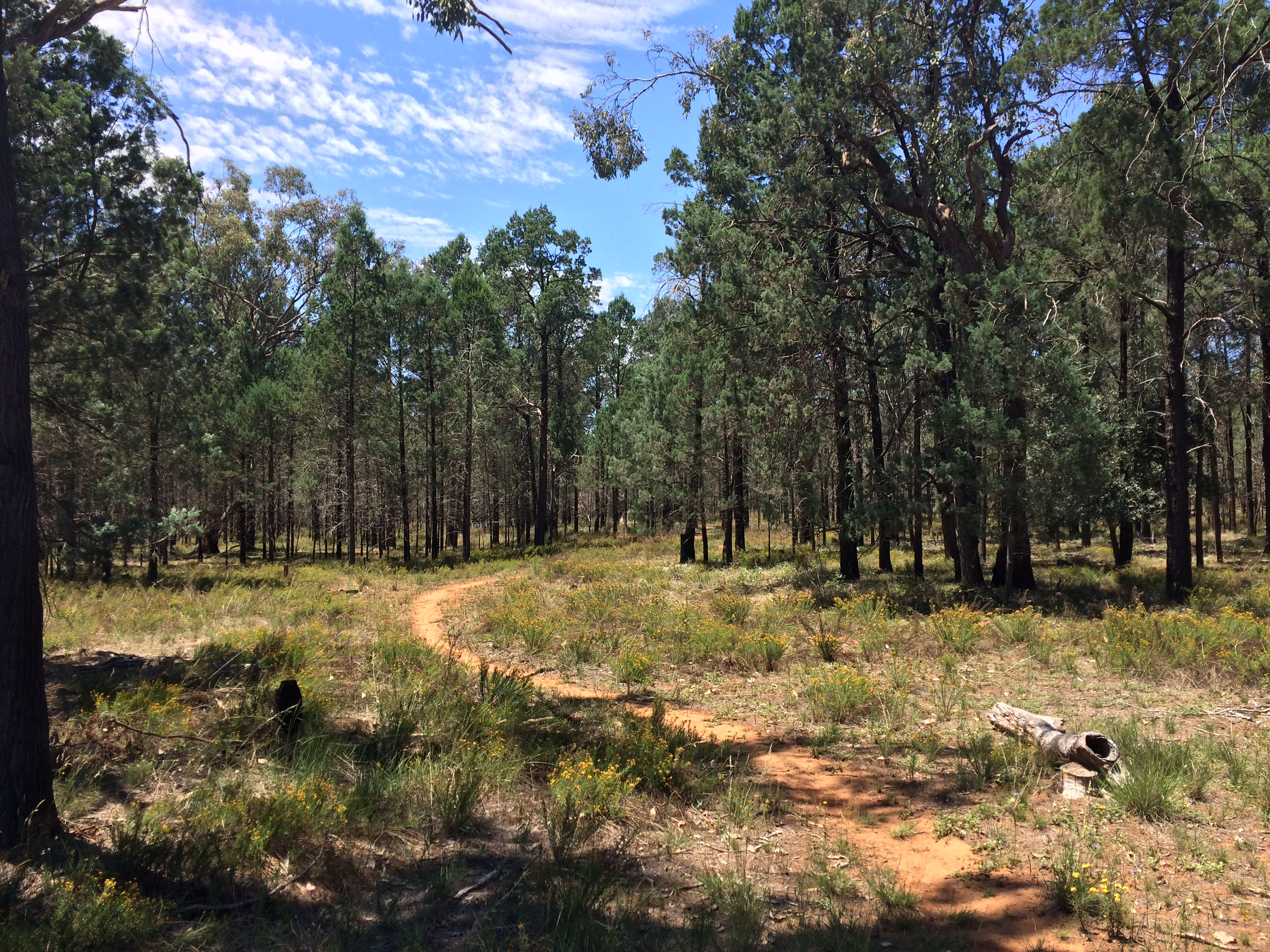
- White cypress pine forest
- Interactive map of Cullivel State Forest

Geography
- Location: South Western Slopes, New South Wales, Australia
- Coordinates: 35°14′19″S 146°24′44″E
- Area: 155 ha (1.6 km^{2}; 0.6 mi^{2})

Administration
- Authority: Forestry Corporation of NSW

Ecology
- Dominant tree species: White cypress pine
- Lesser flora: Grey box

Cullivel State Forest is a native forest, located in the South Western Slopes region of New South Wales, in eastern Australia. The 155 ha (380-acre) state forest is located approximately 16 km (9.9 mi) north-east of Urana.

The now-closed section of the Oaklands railway line passes through the northern section of the state forest.

== Environment ==
Cullivel State Forest is dominated by white cypress pine. Other plant species present within the forest include grey box and bulloak.

At least three species listed under the Biodiversity Conservation Act 2016 have been recorded within the state forest, including grey-crowned babbler.

== See also ==
- State Forests of New South Wales
