= Kentucky State Forest, New South Wales =

State forest in New South Wales, Australia

Kentucky State Forest
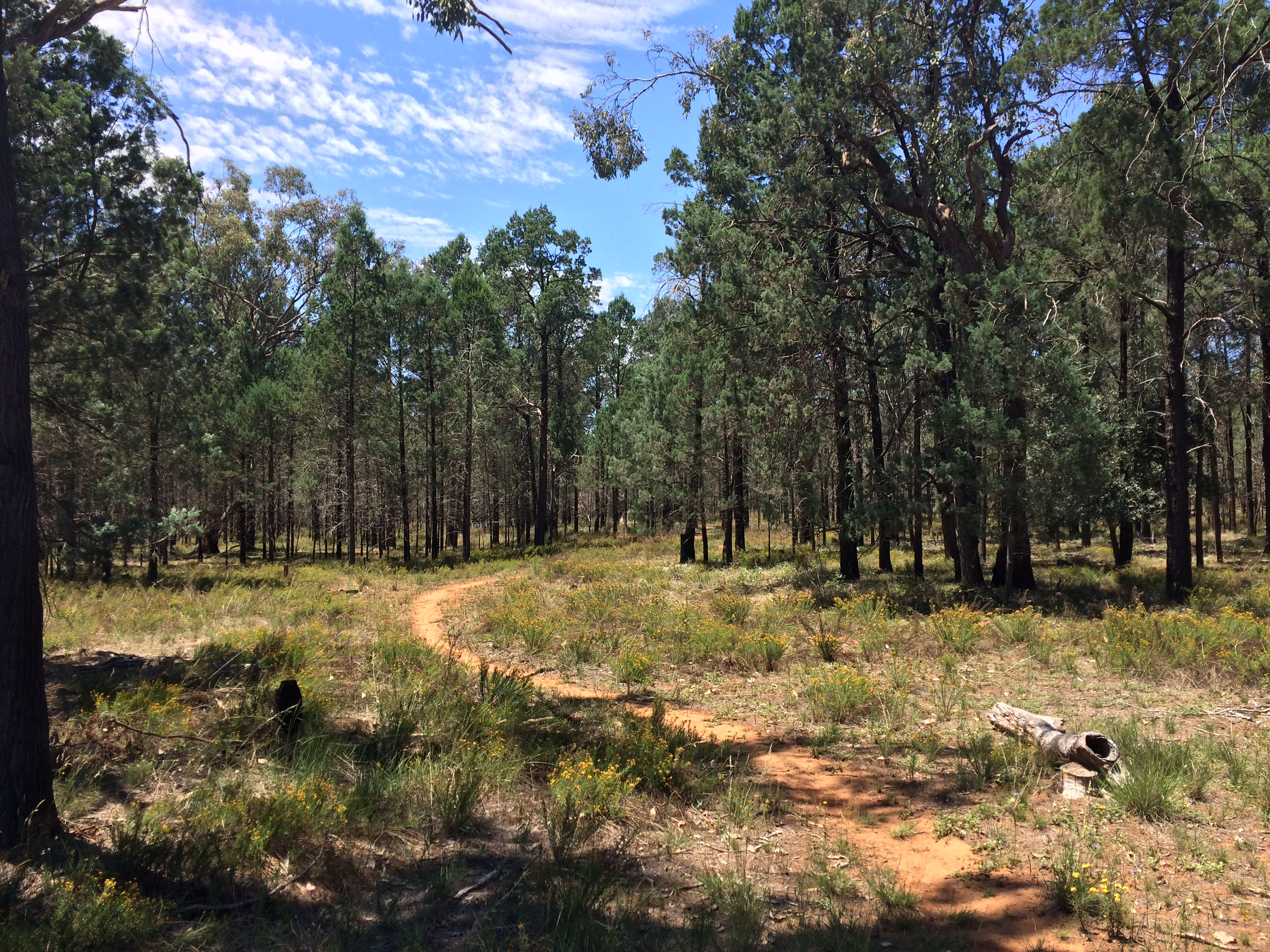
- White cypress pine forest
- Interactive map of Kentucky State Forest

Geography
- Location: South Western Slopes, New South Wales, Australia
- Coordinates: 35°51′37″S 146°32′12″E
- Area: 162 hectares (1.6 km^{2}; 0.6 mi^{2})

Administration
- Authority: Forestry Corporation of NSW

Ecology
- Dominant tree species: White cypress pine
- Lesser flora: Grey box, yellow box, bulloak, wedge-leaf hop-bush, Deane's wattle, sticky everlasting

Kentucky State Forest is a native forest, located in the South Western Slopes region of New South Wales, in eastern Australia. The 162-hectare (400-acre) state forest is located outside the village of Balldale, approximately 14 kilometres (8.7 mi) north-west of Howlong.

== Environment ==
=== Flora ===
Kentucky State Forest is dominated by white cypress pine. Other large tree species present within the forest include grey box and yellow box.

Austral pillwort, listed as endangered in New South Wales, has been recorded in the state forest.

=== Fauna ===
At least 15 fauna species listed under the Biodiversity Conservation Act 2016 have been recorded within the state forest. This includes several bird species, such as the brown treecreeper, diamond firetail, flame robin, grey-crowned babbler, hooded robin, scarlet robin, speckled warbler, swift parrot, turquoise parrot and varied sitella.

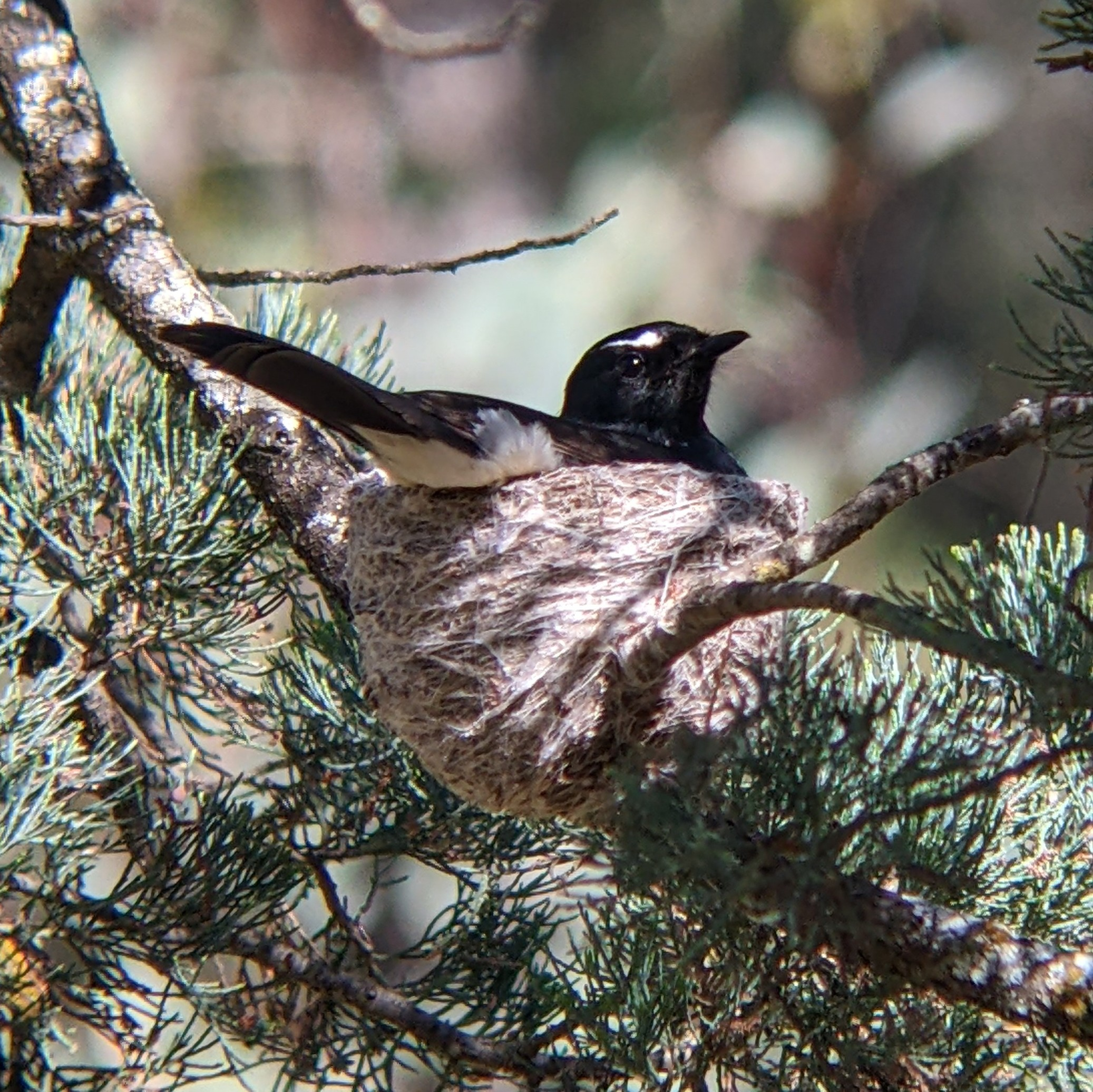
Willie wagtail nesting, Kentucky State Forest

== See also ==
- State Forests of New South Wales
