= State Forests of New South Wales =

Natural areas in Australia

The State Forests of New South Wales include over 2 million hectares (4.9 million acres) of public land managed by the Forestry Corporation of NSW as state forests on behalf of the NSW Government. As of March 2014, there were over 530 state forests in NSW.

Forestry Corporation manages environmental conservation, community access, tourism, fire, land management and timber production within the state forests of NSW. Approximately 225,000 hectares (560,000 acres) of NSW State Forests are softwood timber plantations, and just under 35,000 hectares (86,000 acres) are hardwood timber plantations. Around 1 million hectares (2.5 million acres) of forests are permanently set aside for conservation.

== History ==
In 1871, as settlement advanced through the Colony of New South Wales, with land cleared for cultivation, trees ringbarked for grazing and timber used for the development, the first forest reserves were proclaimed with the aim of preserving the timber resource of the colony. By 1905, more than three million hectares of land was in timber reserves.

The first attempt at a commercial pine plantation was made at Tuncurry State Forest on the mid-north coast in 1912. Eucalypt plantations followed in 1939–40 at Wallaroo State Forest and Whian Whian State Forest (now Whian Whian State Conservation Area) on the north coast. By 1971, 85,000 hectares (210,000 acres) of pine plantation had been established.

In 1916 the Forestry Act 1916 was enacted and the Forestry Commission of NSW, a government department reporting to the Minister for Forests, was established to manage the state's forests. This legislation was replaced by the Forestry Act 2012 and the Forestry Commission was corporatised.

== State forests ==
As of March 2014, NSW state forests are managed under two different divisions, the Hardwood Forests division and Softwood Plantations division. Each division is further divided into regions, with the Hardwood Forests division split into 4 regions, and the Softwood Plantations division split into two regions.

Cumberland State Forest, Australia's only metropolitan state forest, is considered unique in comparison to the other state forests of NSW, and thus is managed by Forestry Corporation independently of the Hardwood Forests division or Softwood Plantations division.

=== Hardwood Forests Division ===
==== Central Region ====
- Aberdare State Forest
- Avon River State Forest
- Awaba State Forest
- Bachelor State Forest
- Ballengarra State Forest
- Barrington Tops State Forest
- Barrow State Forest
- Bellangry State Forest
- Ben Halls Gap State Forest
- Boonanghi State Forest
- Bowman State Forest
- Brassey State Forest
- Bril Bril State Forest
- Broken Bago State Forest
- Bulahdelah State Forest
- Bulga State Forest
- Bulls Ground State Forest
- Burrawan State Forest
- Cairncross State Forest
- Carrai State Forest
- Chichester State Forest
- Cochrane State Forest
- Collombatti State Forest
- Comboyne State Forest
- Coneac State Forest
- Coopernook State Forest
- Corrabare State Forest
- Cowarra State Forest
- Croft Knoll State Forest
- Dingo State Forest
- Doyles River State Forest
- Dyke State Forest
- Enfield State Forest
- Enmore State Forest
- Fosterton State Forest
- Giro State Forest
- Hanging Rock State Forest
- Heaton State Forest
- Ingalba State Forest
- Johns River State Forest
- Kalateenee State Forest
- Kendall State Forest
- Kerewong State Forest
- Kew State Forest
- Kippara State Forest
- Kiwarrak State Forest
- Knorrit State Forest
- Lansdowne State Forest
- Lorne State Forest
- Lower Creek State Forest
- Maria River State Forest
- Masseys Creek State Forest
- McPherson State Forest
- Medowie State Forest
- Mernot State Forest
- Middle Brother State Forest
- Mount Boss State Forest
- Mount Seaview State Forest
- Muswellbrook State Forest
- Myall River State Forest
- Nerong State Forest
- Northern Branch State Forest
- Nowendoc State Forest
- Nulla-Five Day State Forest
- Nundle State Forest
- Old Station State Forest
- Olney State Forest
- Ourimbah State Forest
- Pappinbarra State Forest
- Pee Dee State Forest
- Pokolbin State Forest
- Putty State Forest
- Queens Lake State Forest
- Ravensworth State Forest
- Riamukka State Forest
- Skillion Flat State Forest
- Stewarts Brook State Forest
- Strickland State Forest
- Styx River State Forest
- Tamban State Forest
- Terrible Billy State Forest
- Tomalla State Forest
- Tuggolo State Forest
- Uffington State Forest
- Upsalls Creek State Forest
- Wallaroo State Forest
- Wallingat State Forest
- Wang Wauk State Forest
- Watagan State Forest
- Way Way State Forest
- Wyong State Forest
- Yango State Forest
- Yarratt State Forest
- Yessabah State Forest

==== North East Region ====
- Bagawa State Forest
- Bald Knob State Forest
- Banyabba State Forest
- Barcoongere State Forest
- Beaury State Forest
- Billilimbra State Forest
- Boambee State Forest
- Bom Bom State Forest
- Bonalbo State Forest
- Bookookoorara State Forest
- Boonoo State Forest
- Boorabee State Forest
- Boorook State Forest
- Boundary Creek State Forest
- Braemar State Forest
- Brother State Forest
- Buckra Bendinni State Forest
- Bungabbee State Forest
- Bungawalbin State Forest
- Butterleaf State Forest
- Camira State Forest
- Candole State Forest
- Carwong State Forest
- Chaelundi State Forest
- Cherry Tree State Forest
- Cherry Tree West State Forest
- Clouds Creek State Forest
- Coffs Harbour State Forest
- Conglomerate State Forest
- Curramore State Forest
- Dalmortan State Forest
- Devils Pulpit State Forest
- Diehappy State Forest
- Divines State Forest
- Donaldson State Forest
- Donnybrook State Forest
- Dorrigo State Forest
- Doubleduke State Forest
- Eden Creek State Forest
- Edinburgh Castle State Forest
- Ellangowan State Forest
- Ellis State Forest
- Ewingar State Forest
- Forest Land State Forest
- Fullers State Forest
- Gibberagee State Forest
- Gibraltar Range State Forest
- Gilgurry State Forest
- Girard State Forest
- Gladstone State Forest
- Glen Elgin State Forest
- Glenugie State Forest
- Grange State Forest
- Gundar State Forest
- Hyland State Forest
- Irishman State Forest
- Kangaroo River State Forest
- Keybarbin State Forest
- Koreelah State Forest
- Legume State Forest
- Little Newry State Forest
- Little Spirabo State Forest
- London Bridge State Forest
- Lower Bucca State Forest
- Malara State Forest
- Marara State Forest
- Marengo State Forest
- Mistake State Forest
- Moogem State Forest
- Moonpar State Forest
- ororo State Forest
- Mount Belmore State Forest
- Mount Lindesay State Forest
- Mount Marsh State Forest
- Mount Mitchell State Forest
- Mount Pikapene State Forest
- Muldiva State Forest
- Myrtle State Forest
- Nambucca State Forest
- Nana Creek State Forest
- Never Never State Forest
- Newfoundland State Forest
- Newry State Forest
- Nymboida State Forest
- Oakes State Forest
- Oakwood State Forest
- Orara East State Forest
- Orara West State Forest
- Paddys Land State Forest
- Pine Brush State Forest
- Pine Creek State Forest
- Ramornie State Forest
- Richmond Range State Forest
- Roses Creek State Forest
- Royal Camp State Forest
- Scotchman State Forest
- Sheas Nob State Forest
- South Toonumbar State Forest
- Southgate State Forest
- Spirabo State Forest
- Sugarloaf State Forest
- Tabbimoble State Forest
- Tarkeeth State Forest
- Thumb Creek State Forest
- Toonumber State Forest
- Torrington State Forest
- Tuckers Nob State Forest
- Unumgar State Forest
- Urbenville State Forest
- Viewmont State Forest
- Warra State Forest
- Washpool State Forest
- Way Way State Forest
- Wedding Bells State Forest
- Whiporie State Forest
- Wild Cattle Creek State Forest
- Willsons Downfall State Forest
- Woodenbong State Forest
- Woodford North State Forest
- Yabbra State Forest

==== Southern Region ====
- Badja State Forest
- Bago State Forest
- Bateman State Forest
- Belanglo State Forest
- Benandarah State Forest
- Bermagui State Forest
- Bodalla State Forest
- Bolaro State Forest
- Bombala State Forest
- Bondi State Forest
- Bondo State Forest
- Boyne State Forest
- Broadwater State Forest
- Bruces Creek State Forest
- Buckenbowra State Forest
- Bungongo State Forest
- Carabost State Forest
- Cathcart State Forest
- Clyde State Forest
- Coolangubra State Forest
- Corunna State Forest
- Currambene State Forest
- Currowan State Forest
- Dampier State Forest
- East Boyd State Forest
- Flat Rock State Forest
- Glen Allen State Forest
- Glenbog State Forest
- Gnupa State Forest
- Ingebirah State Forest
- Jerrawangala State Forest
- Kioloa State Forest
- Mannus State Forest
- Maragle State Forest
- McDonald State Forest
- Meryla State Forest
- Micalong State Forest
- Mogo State Forest
- Moruya State Forest
- Mowamba State Forest
- Mumbulla State Forest
- Mundaroo State Forest
- Murraguldrie State Forest
- Murrah State Forest
- Nadgee State Forest
- Nalbaugh State Forest
- North Brooman State Forest
- Nowra State Forest
- Nullica State Forest
- Nungatta State Forest
- Penrose State Forest
- Shallow Crossing State Forest
- Shoalhaven State Forest
- South Brooman State Forest
- Tallaganda State Forest
- Tanja State Forest
- Tantawangalo State Forest
- Termeil State Forest
- Timbillica State Forest
- Tomerong State Forest
- Towamba State Forest
- Tumut State Forest
- Wandella State Forest
- Wandera State Forest
- Wee Jasper State Forest
- Wingello State Forest
- Woodburn State Forest
- Woomargama State Forest
- Yadboro State Forest
- Yambulla State Forest
- Yarrawa State Forest
- Yerriyong State Forest
- Yurammie State Forest

==== Western Region ====
- Airly State Forest
- Albert State Forest
- Ardlethan State Forest
- Baby State Forest
- Back Creek State Forest
- Back Yamma State Forest
- Bald Hill State Forest
- Balgay State Forest
- Balladoran State Forest
- Baradine State Forest
- Barbingal State Forest
- Bebo State Forest
- Beckom State Forest
- Benbraggie State Forest
- Berida State Forest
- Bibblewindi State Forest
- Bimbi State Forest
- Bingara State Forest
- Binya State Forest
- Black Jack State Forest
- Blow Clear West State Forest
- Bobadah State Forest
- Bogolong State Forest
- Booberoi State Forest
- Boona State Forest
- Bourbah State Forest
- Boxalis State Forest
- Boyben State Forest
- Breeza State Forest
- Bretts State Forest
- Brewombenia State Forest
- Broken Range State Forest
- Brookong State Forest
- Buckingbong State Forest
- Bulbodney State Forest
- Bunganbil State Forest
- Bygalore State Forest
- Bylong State Forest
- Caleen State Forest
- Campbells Island State Forest
- Canbelego State Forest
- Canobolas State Forest
- Caragabal State Forest
- Carawandool State Forest
- Cargelligo State Forest
- Carolina State Forest
- Carroboblin State Forest
- Clandulla State Forest
- Clear Ridge State Forest
- Clive State Forest
- Conpaira East State Forest
- Conpaira South State Forest
- Condoblin State Forest
- Coomore Creek State Forest
- Cope State Forest
- Coreen State Forest
- Coricudgy State Forest
- Corringle State Forest
- Cowal State Forest
- Culgoora State Forest
- Cullivel State Forest
- Cumbil State Forest
- Cumbine State Forest
- Curban State Forest
- Curra State Forest
- Curraburrama State Forest
- Currajong State Forest
- Currawananna State Forest
- Daffeys Creek State Forest
- Denny State Forest
- Denobollie State Forest
- Derriwong Mountain State Forest
- Dilly State Forest
- Dinawirindi State Forest
- Doona State Forest
- Dubbo State Forest
- Dungeree State Forest
- East Cookeys Plains State Forest
- Edols State Forest
- Eringanerin State Forest
- Etoo State Forest
- Euchabil State Forest
- Euglo South State Forest
- Euligal State Forest
- Eumungerie State Forest
- Eurabba State Forest
- Fifield State Forest
- Forbes State Forest
- Ganmain State Forest
- Gap Dam State Forest
- Gilgandra State Forest
- Gilgunnia State Forest
- Gillenbah State Forest
- Gilwarny State Forest
- Girilambone State Forest
- Goran State Forest
- Grahway State Forest
- Grayrigg State Forest
- Gunningbland State Forest
- Horseshoe Bend State Forest
- Jacks Creek State Forest
- Janewindi State Forest
- Jingerangle State Forest
- Kandos State Forest
- Kentucky State Forest
- Kerringle State Forest
- Kindra State Forest
- Kockibitoo State Forest
- Kolkilbertoo State Forest
- Koondrook State Forest
- Lachlan Range State Forest
- Lake View State Forest
- Leard State Forest
- Lester State Forest
- Limestone State Forest
- Little Caragabal State Forest
- Lonesome Pine State Forest
- Mandamah State Forest
- Manna State Forest
- Matong State Forest
- Maudry State Forest
- Mejum State Forest
- Melbergen State Forest
- Mellerstain State Forest
- Melougel State Forest
- Merri Merri State Forest
- Merrinele State Forest
- Merriwindi State Forest
- Meryula State Forest
- Miandetta State Forest
- Milbrulong State Forest
- Minnon State Forest
- Minter State Forest
- Momo State Forest
- Monumea Gap State Forest
- Moombooldool State Forest
- Mount Nobby State Forest
- Mount Tilga State Forest
- Mount Topper State Forest
- Mullions Range State Forest
- Mulyandry State Forest
- Munro State Forest
- Murda State Forest
- Nangerybone State Forest
- Naradhan State Forest
- Narrandera State Forest
- Narraway State Forest
- Nebea State Forest
- Nerang Cowal State Forest
- New Valley State Forest
- Nullo Mountain State Forest
- Orr State Forest
- Palmer State Forest
- Pangee State Forest
- Parkhurst State Forest
- Peisley State Forest
- Perricoota State Forest
- Pilliga East State Forest
- Pilliga West State Forest
- Pine Ridge State Forest
- Priddle State Forest
- Pullabooka State Forest
- Quegoble State Forest
- Ringwood Tank State Forest
- Sandgate State Forest
- Severn State Forest
- Spring Ridge State Forest
- Strahorn State Forest
- Strathmore State Forest
- Stuart State Forest
- Tabbita State Forest
- Tabratong State Forest
- Tailby State Forest
- Talgong State Forest
- Tallegar State Forest
- Teratta State Forest
- Tenandra State Forest
- Therarbung State Forest
- Thorndale State Forest
- Timmallallie State Forest
- Tomanbil State Forest
- Tongo State Forest
- Tottenham State Forest
- Trundle State Forest
- Tuckland State Forest
- Tullamore State Forest
- Ugobit State Forest
- Ungarie State Forest
- Vermont Hill State Forest
- Vickery State Forest
- Wahgunyah State Forest
- Walleroobie State Forest
- Warialda State Forest
- Warraderry State Forest
- Warregal State Forest
- Warrie State Forest
- Waubebunga State Forest
- Weddin State Forest
- Weelah State Forest
- Wharfdale State Forest
- Widgiewa State Forest
- Wilbertroy State Forest
- Wilga State Forest
- Willows State Forest
- Wittenbra State Forest
- Wolgan State Forest
- Wombin State Forest
- Wyrra State Forest
- Yalcogrin State Forest
- Yambira State Forest
- Yarindury State Forest
- Yarragong State Forest
- Yarranjerry State Forest
- Yearinan State Forest
- Yelikin State Forest
- Yetman State Forest

=== Softwood Plantations Division ===
==== Northern Region ====
- Armidale State Forest
- Banyabba State Forest
- Barcoongere State Forest
- Beaury State Forest
- Ben Bullen State Forest
- Blenheim State Forest
- Camira State Forest
- Canobolas State Forest
- Clouds Creek State Forest
- Copeton State Forest
- Dog Rocks State Forest
- Eden Creek State Forest
- Essington State Forest
- Falnash State Forest
- Gibberagee State Forest
- Glenwood State Forest
- Gurnang State Forest
- Hampton State Forest
- Jenolan State Forest
- Kinross State Forest
- Koreelah State Forest
- Lidsdale State Forest
- Lowes Mount State Forest
- Moonpar State Forest
- Mount David State Forest
- Mount Mitchell State Forest
- Mount Pikapene State Forest
- Mount Topper State Forest
- Mullions Range State Forest
- Neville State Forest
- Newnes State Forest
- Norway State Forest
- Nowendoc State Forest
- Nundle State Forest
- Pennsylvania State Forest
- Riamukka State Forest
- Roseberg State Forest
- Spirabo State Forest
- Sunny Corner State Forest
- Toonumber State Forest
- Tuggolo State Forest
- Turon State Forest
- Vittoria State Forest
- Vulcan State Forest
- Whiporie State Forest
- Wild Cattle Creek State Forest
- Yabbra State Forest

==== Snowy Region ====
- Bago State Forest
- Batlow State Forest
- Belanglo State Forest
- Billapaloola State Forest
- Bombala State Forest
- Bondi State Forest
- Bondo State Forest
- Bungongo State Forest
- Carabost State Forest
- Cathcart State Forest
- Coolangubra State Forest
- Craigie State Forest
- Glen Allen State Forest
- Glenbog State Forest
- Green Hills State Forest
- Mannus State Forest
- Maragle State Forest
- Meryla State Forest
- Micalong State Forest
- Mundaroo State Forest
- Murraguldrie State Forest
- Nalbaugh State Forest
- Penrose State Forest
- Red Hill State Forest
- Tallaganda State Forest
- Towamba State Forest
- Tumut State Forest
- Wee Jasper State Forest
- Wingello State Forest
- Yambulla State Forest
