= Bungawalbin State Forest =

Bungawalbin State Forest is a 1200 hectare forest to the east of Braemar State Forest and the Summerland Way. It is about 25 kilometres south west of Coraki in New South Wales.
