= Wingello State Forest =

Coordinates: 34.724234°S 150.177552°E

Wingello State Forest is a planted forest in the Australian state of New South Wales. It is located in the Southern Highlands between Sydney and Goulburn. The forest is managed by the Forestry Corporation of NSW and includes pine plantations, hardwood forest and native forests with stands of peppermint, manna gum and stringybarks. It is popular with mountain bike riders. The first radiata pines were planted in this area in Belanglo State Forest in 1919. Today there are around 3,500 hectares of commercial pine plantations in the southern highlands, with timber being processed at a local mill.
