= Braemar State Forest =

Braemar State Forest is a 2000-hectare forest straddling the Summerland Way about 25 kilometres south of Casino, New South Wales in Australia.

On 28 April 2008, the New South Wales government gazetted that appropriately licensed people could hunt game and feral animals in Braemar State Forest; the declaration remains in force for five years.

Braemar State Forest is also the name of a forest near Dalby, Queensland.
