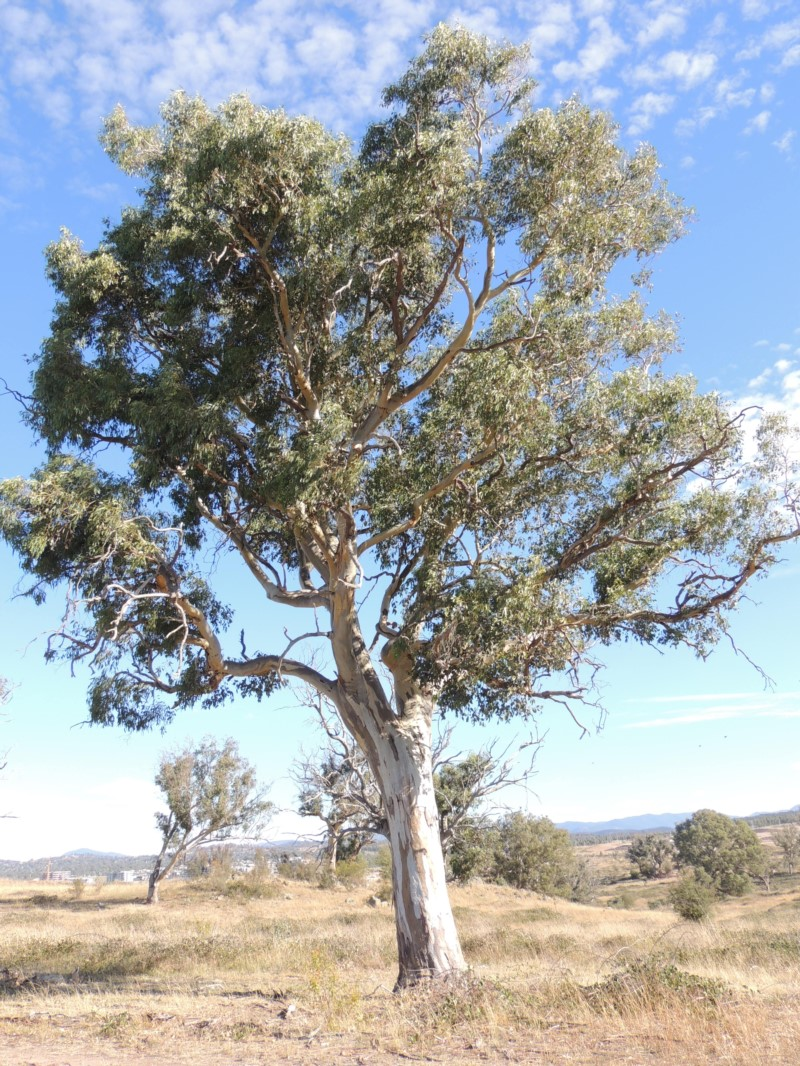
- Eucalyptus blakelyi growing in the A.C.T.

Conservation status
- Vulnerable (IUCN 3.1)

Scientific classification
- Kingdom: Plantae
- Clade: Tracheophytes
- Clade: Angiosperms
- Clade: Eudicots
- Clade: Rosids
- Order: Myrtales
- Family: Myrtaceae
- Genus: Eucalyptus
- Species: E. blakelyi

Binomial name
- Eucalyptus blakelyi Maiden

Synonyms
- Eucalyptus blakelyi Maiden var. blakelyi; Eucalyptus blakelyi var. irrorata Blakely; Eucalyptus blakelyi var. parvifructa Blakely

= Eucalyptus blakelyi =

Blakely's red gum

Species of eucalyptus

Eucalyptus blakelyi, known as Blakely's red gum, is a tree endemic to eastern Australia. It has smooth bark on its trunk and branches, dull bluish green, lance-shaped adult leaves, flower buds usually in groups of seven, white flowers and cup-shaped to hemispherical fruit.

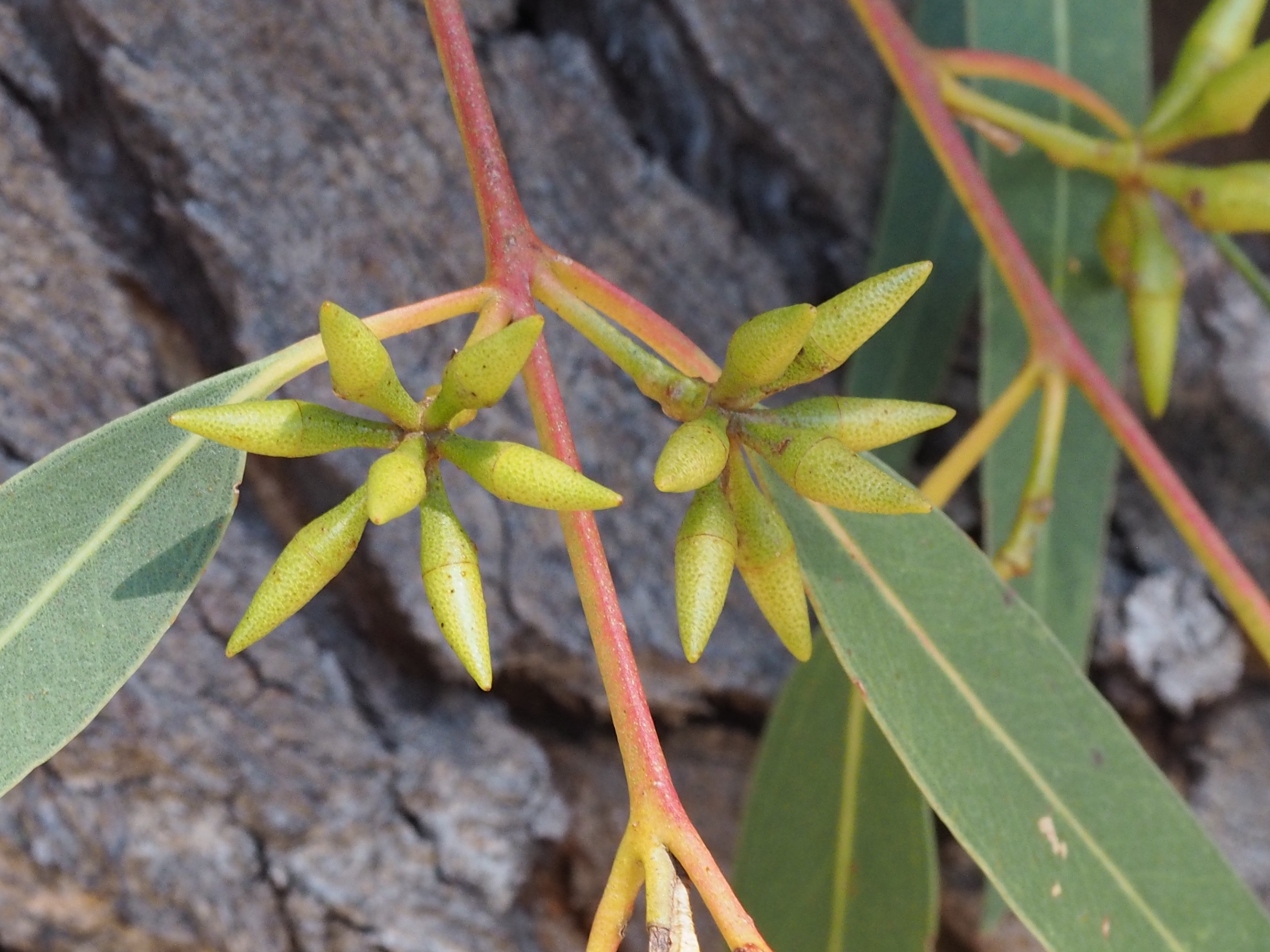
Flower buds

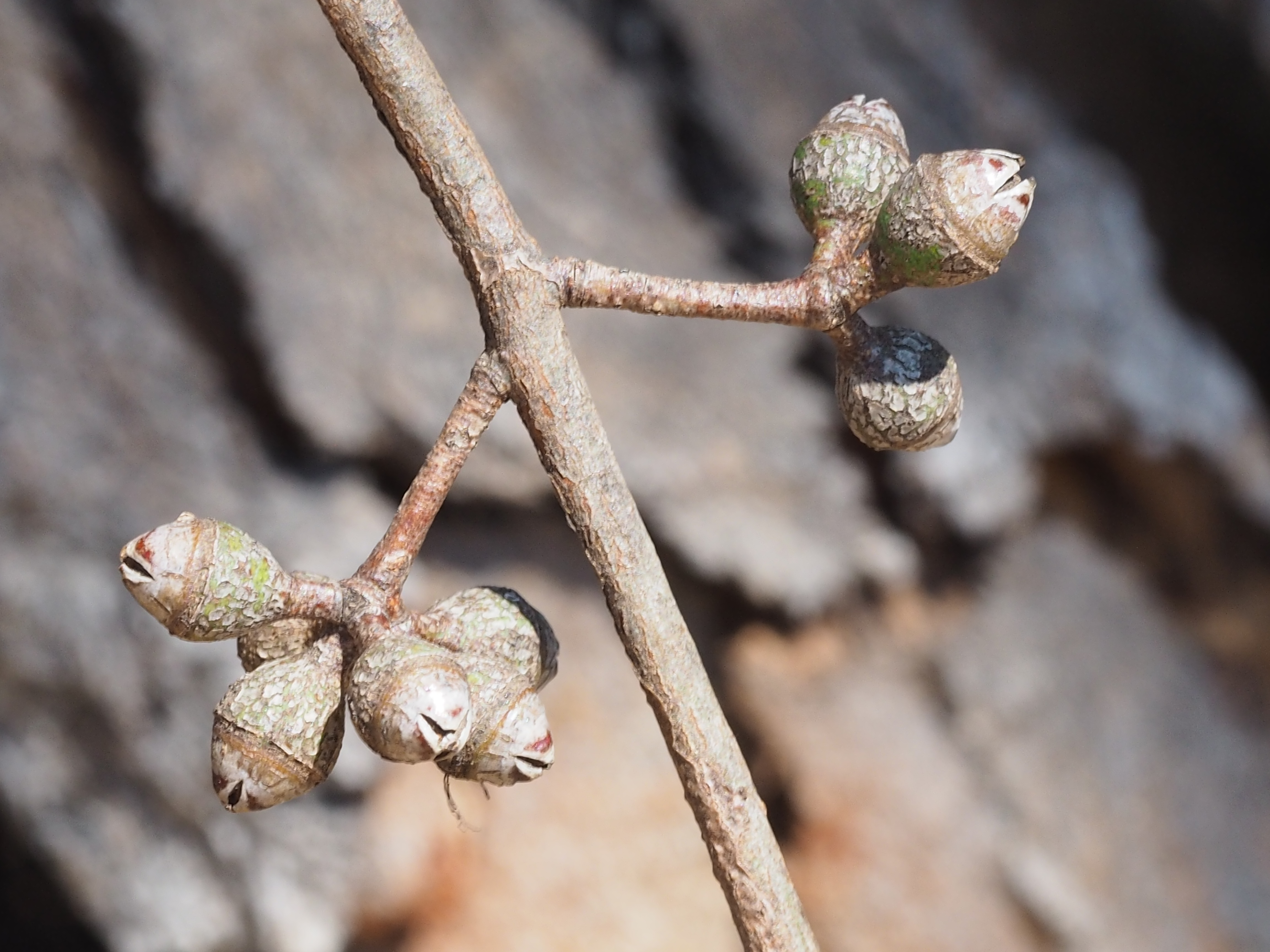
Fruit

== Description ==
Eucalyptus blakelyi is a tree that grows to a height of 20–25 metres (66–82 ft) and forms a lignotuber. The bark on the trunk and branches is smooth, pale grey, cream-coloured and white with patches of other colours. Young plants and coppice regrowth have stems that are square in cross section and usually egg-shaped leaves 40–100 mm (1.6–3.9 in) long and 33–70 mm (1.3–2.8 in) wide with a petiole. Adult leaves are lance-shaped to curved, the same bluish green on both sides, 60–200 mm (2.4–7.9 in) long and 5–45 mm (0.2–2 in) wide on a petiole 10–25 mm (0.4–1 in) long. The flower buds are usually arranged in groups of seven but sometimes up to fifteen in leaf axils on a peduncle 5–19 mm (0.2–0.7 in) long, the individual flowers on a pedicel 1–7 mm (0.04–0.3 in) long. Mature buds are oval to spindle-shaped, 8–14 mm (0.31–0.55 in) long and 3–6 mm (0.12–0.24 in) wide with a conical to horn-shaped operculum 5–11 mm (0.20–0.43 in) long. Flowering occurs from October to December and the flowers are white. The fruit are hemispherical to compressed hemispherical, 2–5 mm (0.08–0.2 in) long and 4–8 mm (0.2–0.3 in) wide on a pedicel 1–6 mm (0.04–0.2 in) long with the valves protruding.

== Taxonomy and naming ==
Eucalyptus blakelyi was first formally described in 1917 by Joseph Maiden from a specimen collected in the Pilliga scrub by Harald Jensen. The description was published in A Critical Revision of the Genus Eucalyptus. The specific epithet (blakelyi) honours Maiden's assistant, William Faris Blakely.

== Distribution and habitat ==
Blakely's red gum grows in woodland and open forest, mainly on the tablelands of New South Wales and the Australian Capital Territory but also in the far south-east of Queensland and north-eastern Victoria. It sometimes grows in seasonally waterlogged depressions but also on stony rises.
