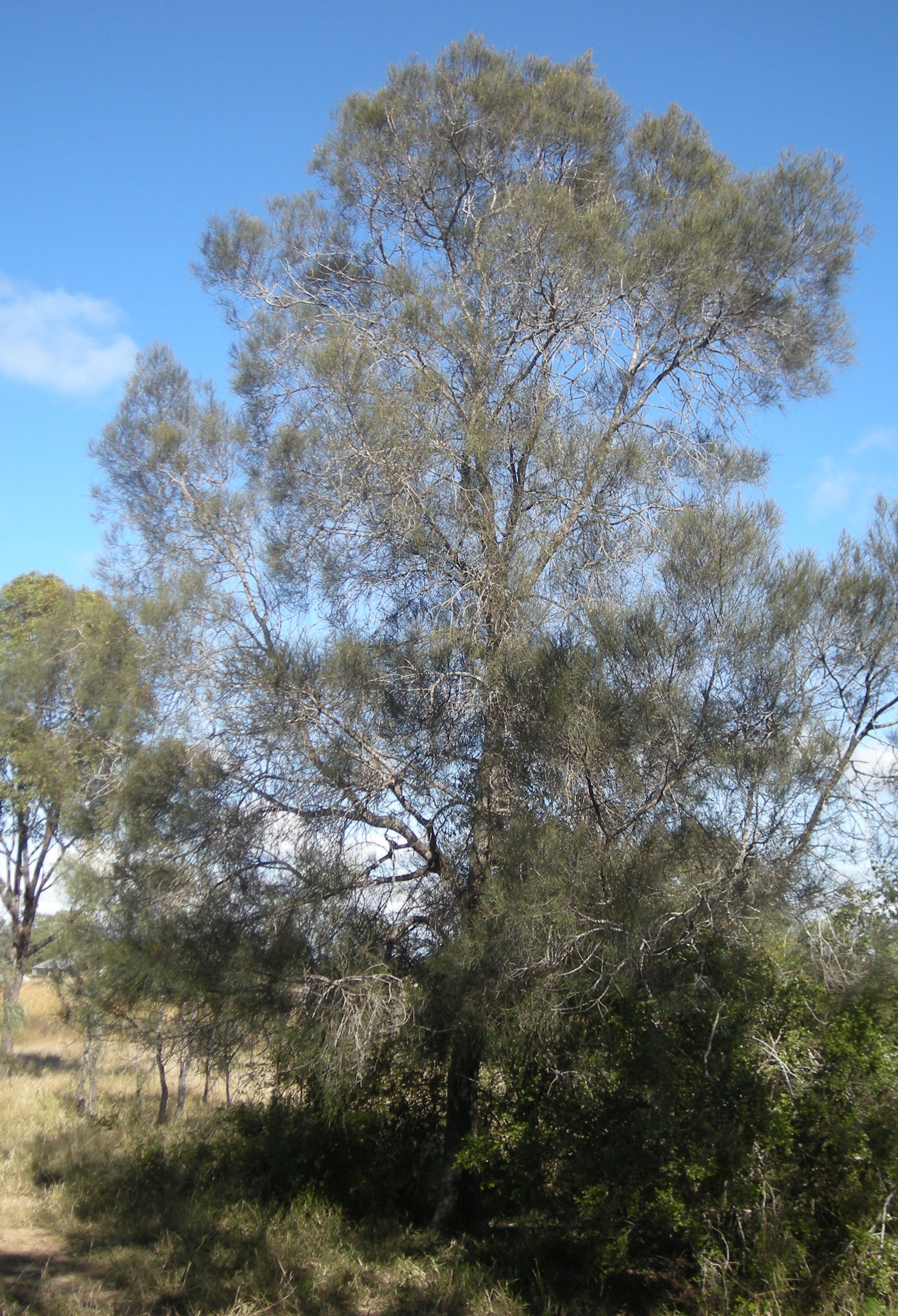

Conservation status
- Vulnerable (IUCN 3.1)

Scientific classification
- Kingdom: Plantae
- Clade: Embryophytes
- Clade: Tracheophytes
- Clade: Spermatophytes
- Clade: Angiosperms
- Clade: Eudicots
- Clade: Rosids
- Order: Fagales
- Family: Casuarinaceae
- Genus: Allocasuarina
- Species: A. luehmannii

Binomial name
- Allocasuarina luehmannii (R.T.Baker) L.A.S.Johnson
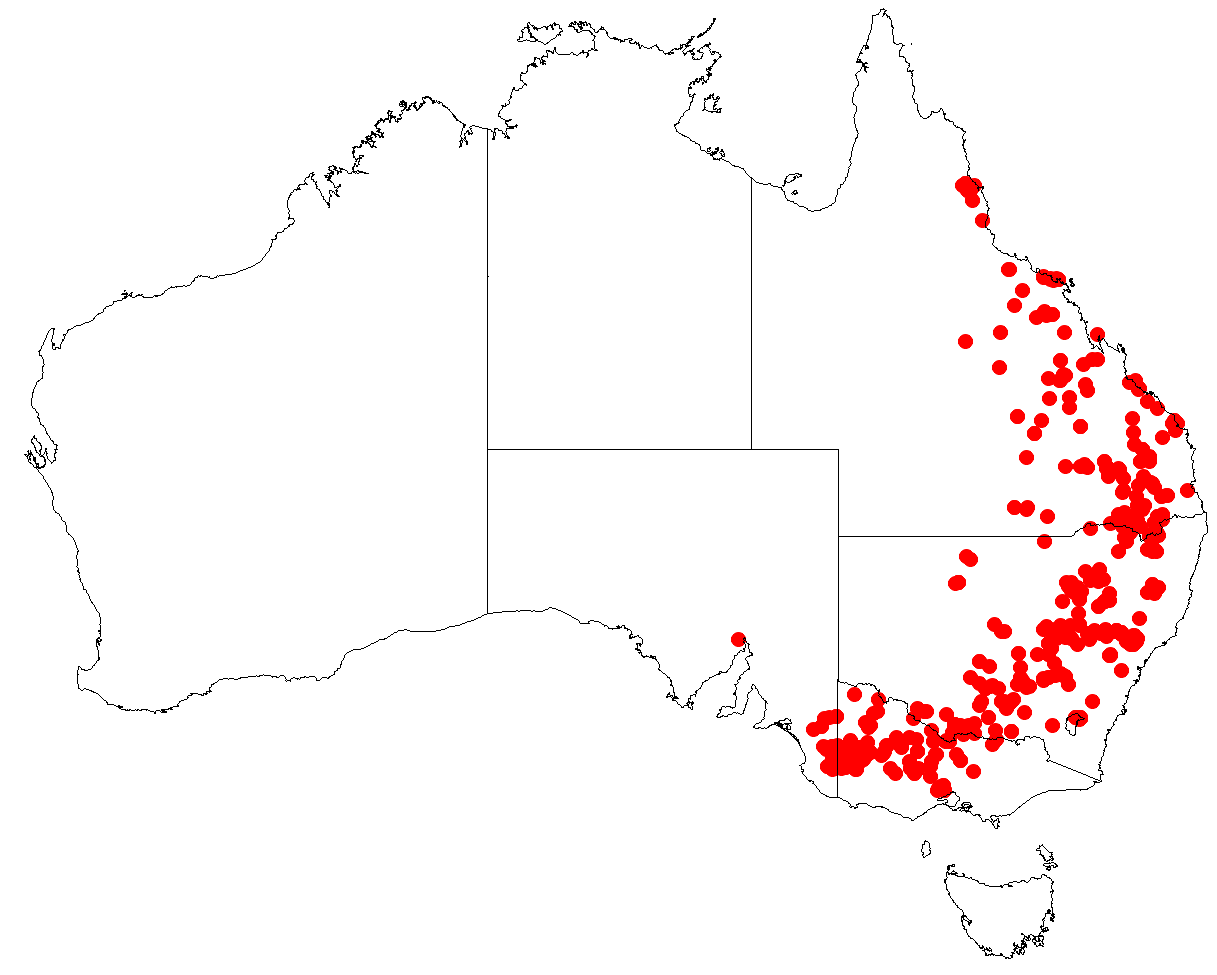
- Occurrence data from AVH

Synonyms
- Allocasuarina luehmannii L.A.S.Johnson nom. inval.; Casuarina luehmanni R.T.Baker orth. var.; Casuarina luehmannii R.T.Baker

= Allocasuarina luehmannii =

Species of tree

Allocasuarina luehmannii, commonly known as buloke or bull-oak, is a species of flowering plant in the family Casuarinaceae and is endemic to south-eastern continental Australia. It is a dioecious tree, that has its leaves reduced to scales in whorls of ten to fourteen, and the mature fruiting cones are 5–12 mm (0.2–0.5 in) long containing winged seeds (samaras) 4–5 mm (0.16–0.20 in) long.

== Description ==
Allocasuarina luehmannii is a dioecious tree that typically grows to a height of 5–15 m (16–49 ft) and has furrowed bark. Its branchlets are more or less erect, up to 400 mm (16 in) long, the leaves reduced to scale-like teeth 0.5–1 mm (0.02–0.04 in) long, arranged in whorls of ten to fourteen around the branchlets. The sections of branchlet between the leaf whorls (the "articles") are 8–22 mm (0.3–0.9 in) long, 1–2 mm (0.04–0.08 in) wide and often waxy. Male flowers are arranged in spikes 50–105 mm (2–4 in) long, in whorls of five to eight per cm (per 0.4 in), the anthers 1.0–1.3 mm (0.04–0.05 in) long. Female cones are sessile or on a peduncle up to 5 mm (0.2 in) long, the mature cones shortly cylindrical, 5–12 mm (0.2–0.5 in) long and 8–14 mm (0.3–0.6 in) in diameter containing reddish-brown samaras 4–5 mm (0.16–0.20 in) long.

== Taxonomy and naming ==
Bull-oak was first formally described in 1900 by Richard Thomas Baker, who gave it the name Casuarina luehmannii in the Proceedings of the Linnean Society of New South Wales from specimens collected by Richard Hind Cambage. It was subsequently reclassified in the Allocasuarina genus as A.luehmannii by Lawrence Alexander Sidney Johnson in 1985 in the Journal of the Adelaide Botanic Gardens.

The Wiradjuri people of New South Wales use the name Ngany to refer to this species.

== Distribution and habitat ==
Allocasuarina luehmannii usually grows in scattered places in woodland from Mareeba and south through central Queensland, New South Wales and the Australian Capital Territory to north-western Victoria and nearby areas of South Australia. It rarely occurs near the coast, except in the Hunter Valley and near Rockhampton.

== Ecology ==
This tree is an important food resource for the endangered southeastern subspecies of the red-tailed black cockatoo in the Wimmera region of western Victoria, where some remnant stands are threatened by farming practices.

== Uses ==
=== Wood ===
The wood of buloke is commonly used for knife handles, flooring, fine furniture and turned objects and is the hardest known wood in the world, with a Janka hardness of 16,740 N (3,760 lb_{f}).

=== Aboriginal uses ===
The Wiradjuri people of NSW use the timber and resinous sap to make a range of tools and other implements, including weapons, such as boomerangs and clubs. Wiradjuri people also value the species due to its ability to attract many animals that are food sources, such as possums and birds.

The Shire of Buloke in Victoria, Australia is named after this tree species.

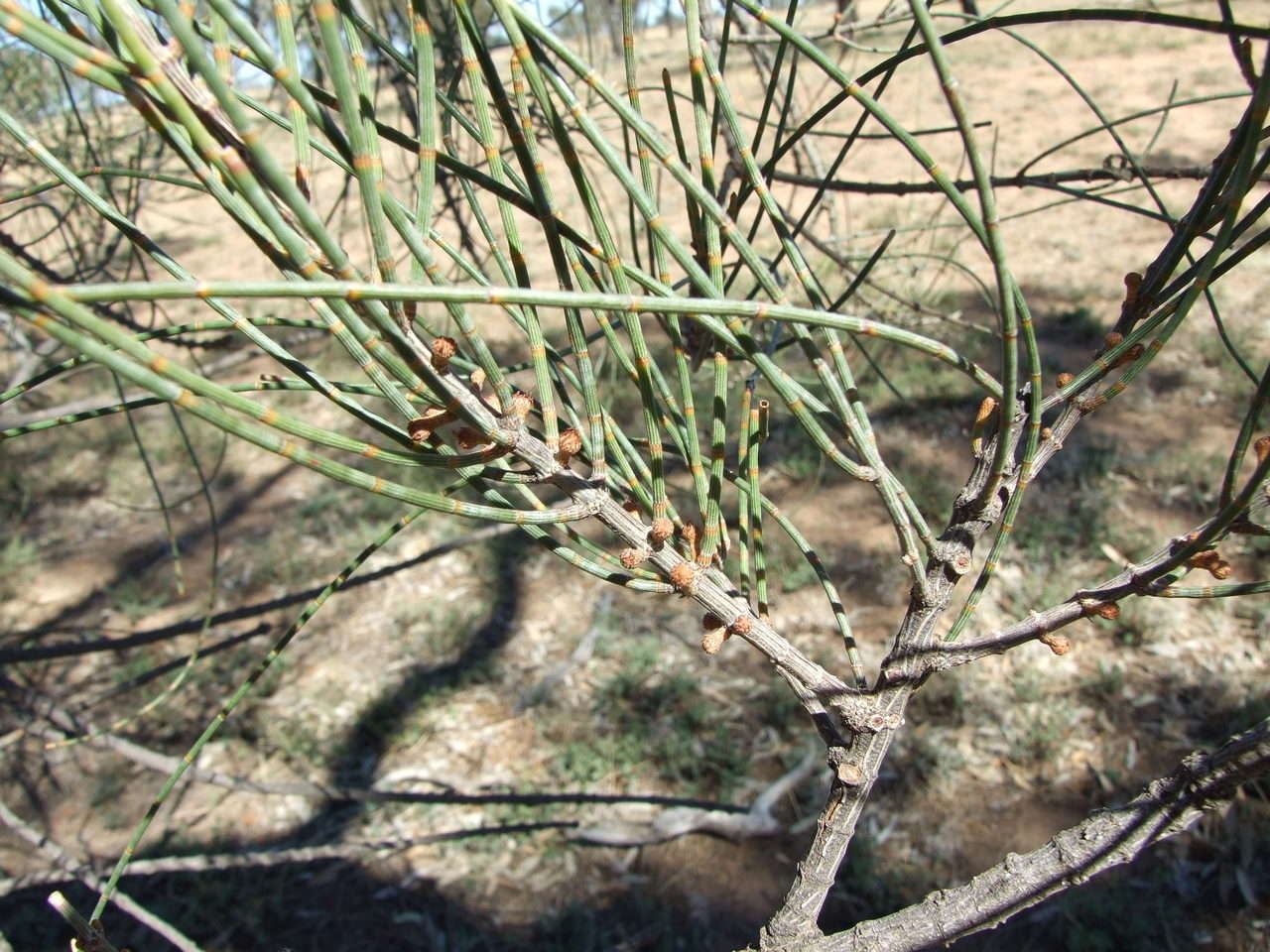
Branchlets and immature female cones

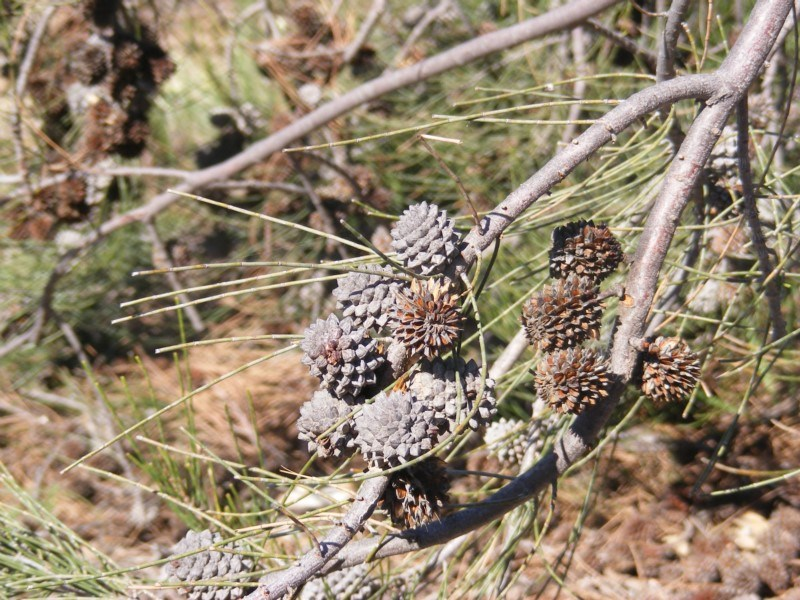
Mature female cones
