= Biodiversity Conservation Act 2016 (NSW) =

Act of parliament in New South Wales

Parliament of New South Wales
- Long title: An Act relating to the conservation of biodiversity; and to repeal the Threatened Species Conservation Act 1995, the Nature Conservation Trust Act 2001 and the animal and plant provisions of the National Parks and Wildlife Act 1974.
- Passed by: Legislative Council
- Passed: 16 November 2016
- Passed by: Legislative Assembly
- Passed: 17 November 2016
- Assented to: 23 November 2016
- Commenced: 23 November 2016

Legislative history

First chamber: Legislative Council
- Bill title: Biodiversity Conservation Bill
- Introduced by: Niall Blair
- First reading: 9 November 2016
- Second reading: 15 November 2016
- Third reading: 16 November 2016

Second chamber: Legislative Assembly
- Bill title: Biodiversity Conservation Bill
- Member(s) in charge: Mark Speakman
- First reading: 16 November 2016
- Second reading: 17 November 2016
- Third reading: 17 November 2016

Related legislation
- Threatened Species Conservation Act 1995, Nature Conservation Trust Act 2001, National Parks and Wildlife Act 1974
- Status: Current legislation

The Biodiversity Conservation Act 2016 (BC Act) is a state-based act of parliament in New South Wales (NSW). It replaced the Threatened Species Conservation Act 1995, and commenced on 25 August 2017.

The purpose of the legislation was to effect biodiversity reform in New South Wales, in particular to provide better environmental outcomes and reduce burdensome regulations. The Act lists many more purposes under the rubric of "ecologically sustainable development" than the former act, and specifically mentions "biodiversity conservation in the context of a changing climate".

As of May 2021, the BC Act is administered by the NSW Department of Planning, Industry and Environment.

== Threatened Species Scientific Committee ==
Division 7 of Part 4 of the BC Act established the Threatened Species Scientific Committee, which can provide advice to declare species, populations, and ecological communities as endangered. Under the Biodiversity Conservation Act 2016, the Scientific Committee has declared various threatened species including the alpine she-oak skink (Cyclodomorphus praealtus) and the alpine tree frog (Litoria verreauxii alpina), while the Scientific Committee has determined "Eastern Suburbs Banksia Scrub" to be a critically endangered ecological community.

The main functions of the Threatened Species Scientific Committee include:

- Assessing the risk of extinction of a species in Australia and deciding which species should be listed as critically endangered, endangered, vulnerable or extinct in NSW;
- For species that are not listed as threatened species, deciding if there are populations of those species that should be listed as threatened in NSW;
- Assessing the risk of extinction of an ecological community in Australia and deciding which ecological communities should be listed as critically endangered, endangered, vulnerable or collapsed ecological communities;
- Deciding which key threats to native plants and animals should be declared key threatening processes under the Biodiversity Conservation Act 2016 (BC Act); and
- Reviewing and updating the lists of threatened species, populations and communities and key threatening processes in the schedules of the BC Act.
