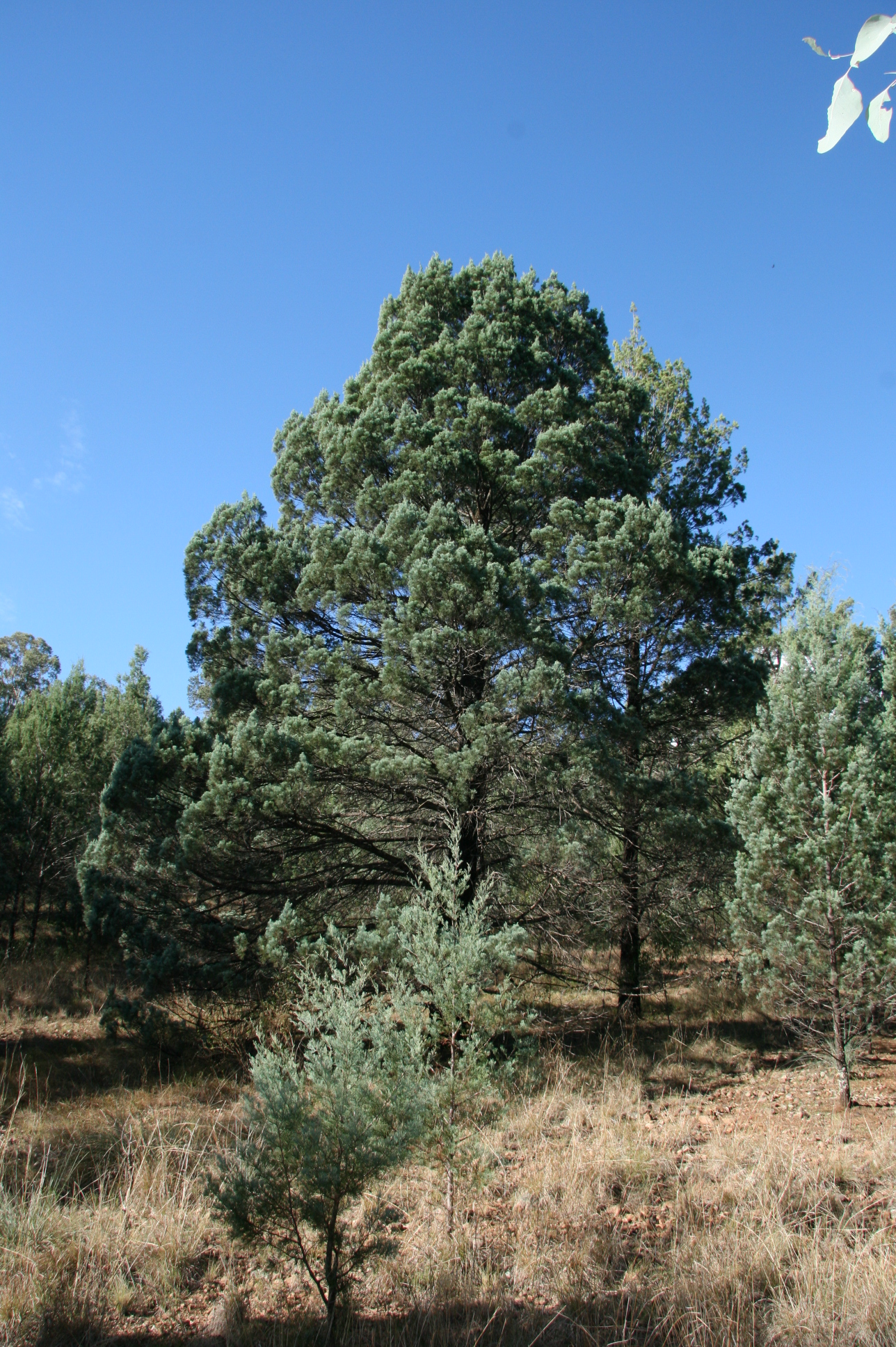

Scientific classification
- Kingdom: Plantae
- Clade: Tracheophytes
- Clade: Gymnosperms
- Division: Pinophyta
- Class: Pinopsida
- Order: Cupressales
- Family: Cupressaceae
- Genus: Callitris
- Species: C. glaucophylla

Binomial name
- Callitris glaucophylla J.Thomps. & L.A.S.Johnson

Synonyms
- Callitris columellaris var. campestris Silba; Callitris columellaris subsp. campestris (Silba) Silba; Callitris columellaris f. glauca F.M.Bailey

= Callitris glaucophylla =

Species of flowering plant

Callitris glaucophylla is a species of conifer in the family Cupressaceae. It is a tree endemic to Australia, where it grows in New South Wales, the Northern Territory, Queensland, South Australia, Victoria, and Western Australia.
