= Forestry Corporation of NSW =

Forestry company in Australia

- Company type: Statutory state-owned enterprise
- Industry: Forestry
- Predecessor: Forestry Commission of NSW
- Founded: 2012
- Headquarters: West Pennant Hills, Sydney, Australia
- Key people: Anshul Chaudhary, CEO; Stefanie Loader, Chair/Non-Executive Director
- Services: Native and plantation forest management
- Revenue: ▲ A$385 million (FY 2022–2023)
- Total assets: ▲ A$236.302 million (2023)
- Owner: Government of New South Wales
- Number of employees: 612 (June 2023)
- Website: www.forestrycorporation.com.au

The Forestry Corporation of NSW is a state-owned corporation that has been appointed to manage environmental conservation, community access, tourism, fire, land management and renewable timber production across 2 million hectares (4.9 million acres) of public land on behalf of the NSW Government.

== History ==
In 1871, as settlement advanced through the Colony of New South Wales, with land cleared for cultivation, trees ringbarked for grazing and timber used for the development of the colony, the first forest reserves were proclaimed with the aim of preserving the timber resource of the colony. By 1905, more than three million hectares of land was in timber reserves.

The first attempt at a commercial pine plantation was made at Tuncurry State Forest on the mid-north coast in 1912. Eucalypt plantations followed in 1939–40 at Wallaroo State Forest and Whian Whian State Forest (now Whian Whian State Conservation Area) on the north coast. By 1971, 85,000 hectares (210,000 acres) of pine plantation had been established.

In 1916, the Forestry Act 1916 was enacted and the Forestry Commission of NSW, a government department reporting to the Minister for Forests, was established to manage the state's forests. This legislation was replaced by the Forestry Act 2012 and the Forestry Commission was corporatised.

The Black Summer bushfires of summer 2019-20 burnt half of Forestry Corporation's native forest estate and a quarter of its softwood plantations.

== Operations ==
Forestry Corporation manages 2,186,893 hectares (5,403,930 acres) of multiple-use state forests, including coastal native forests, cypress forests and red gum forests, approximately 225,000 hectares (560,000 acres) of softwood timber plantations in the central west, south and north of New South Wales and just under 35,000 hectares (86,000 acres) of hardwood timber plantations in north east NSW. Around 1 million hectares (2.5 million acres) of forests are permanently set aside for conservation. The land managed by Forestry Corporation is primarily State Forests, with small areas of freehold and private land managed through joint investment partnerships.

=== Compliance ===
The NSW Environment Protection Authority has described Forestry Corporation as having a "history of noncompliance". In March 2022 Forestry Corporation was fined for breaching forestry rules, including destroying hollow-bearing trees at Mogo State Forest, and habitat for Critically Endangered Swift parrots at Bodalla State Forest and Boyne State Forest. In June 2022, they were fined over A$285,000 for felling trees in koala habitat exclusion zones at Wild Cattle Creek State Forest.

=== Calls for ending native timber forestry ===
Several groups have called for an end to native forestry in NSW, including the NSW Greens, World Wildlife Fund, Wilderness Australia, National Parks Association of NSW, and Nature Conservation Council of NSW. However, in June 2022, the NSW Agriculture Minister signalled that the government has no plans to phase out logging of native hardwood in state forests.
