= Livingstone National Park =

National park in Australia

- IUCN category II (national park)
- Location within New South Wales
- Location: New South Wales
- Nearest city: Mangoplah
- Coordinates: 35°22′8.15″S 147°21′35.71″E
- Area: 19.19 km^{2} (7.41 sq mi)
- Established: January 2001
- Governing body: New South Wales National Parks and Wildlife Service

Livingstone is a national park and state conservation area located 30 kilometres (19 mi) south of Wagga Wagga and 10 kilometres (6.2 mi) east of Mangoplah, in the South West Slopes region of south western New South Wales.

== History ==
The national park originally was proclaimed as a State Forest in 1915 for timber located within the forest which was to be preserved for the town of Junee. A branch line from Mangoplah to Westby was located next to the state forest to carry timber but was later dismantled. A report by the New South Wales Forestry Commission found that the forest was only one of its type left, with further studies on the forest found a colony of squirrel gliders, which are the only two colonies left within southern New South Wales, three types of orchids and over 100 species of native birds. In 1976, the Wagga Wildlife and Conservation Society requested that the state forest to be gazetted as a national park after it was under threat; however, the request was turned down. In January 2001 the state forest was gazetted as a national park with an area of 1,919 hectares.

== Environment ==
The park has four types of vegetation, including grass trees, mallee, kangaroo grass and open forest. It is part of the South-west Slopes of NSW Important Bird Area (IBA), identified as such by BirdLife International because of its importance for the conservation of swift parrots and superb parrots.

A variety of recreational activities are on offer in Livingstone National Park, including a multi-use track for walking, bike riding or horse riding.

== Ecology ==
=== Flora ===
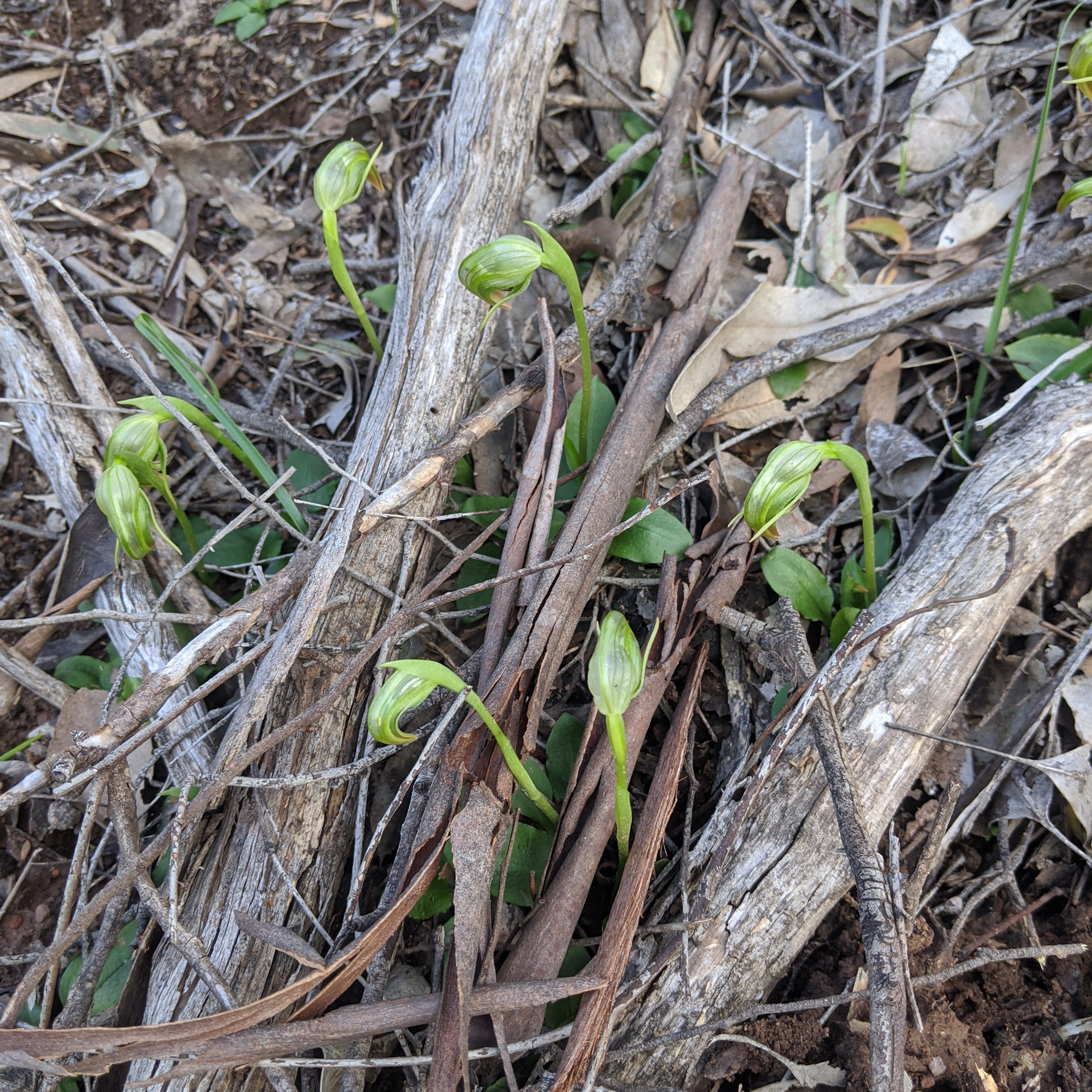
Nodding greenhood orchid, Livingstone National Park

Livingstone National Park is a rare example of the landscape that existed in the South West Slopes area before agricultural development and it contains the only South West Slopes example of tall shrubland on a public reserve. Six separate types of vegetation are described in the Livingstone National Park and State Conservation Area Plan of Management, all of which are types of open forest and woodlands, with the exception of this tall shrubland community on the plateau tops. Livingstone provides a sanctuary for the vulnerable Yass Daisy Ammobium craspedioides, at the South western extent of its range. It also contains entire ecological communities which are considered endangered. The white box, red box and Blakely's red gum associations in the park are part of the Endangered Ecological Community known as White Box-Yellow Box-Blakely's Red Gum Woodland.

In the South West Slopes region large reserves like Livingstone National Park sit like islands in the middle of an extensively cleared landscape. When Benson described the condition of natural vegetation in NSW in 1991 he included the Western slopes as one of the most 'markedly altered' areas, due to its suitability for agriculture. Benson estimated that since settlement 90% of white box – yellow box- Blakely's red gum vegetation had been cleared and that which remained was being further degraded by grazing pressures. Benson points out that the Forestry Act of 1916 did play a role in protecting forests, and we know from the history above, that Livingstone exists due to its reservation for forestry, when much of the landscape was being changed. At the time of writing he described the Western Slopes Box Woodlands as one of the most poorly conserved native vegetation types in the state.

Many authors, concerned with conservation, refer to Bensons work when they talk about the extent of the original clearing that has greatly pressured the viability of these Western slopes Box gum woodlands. These authors discuss how future management of this heavily cleared vegetation community can bring it back to a viable state. In 1995 Prober and Thiele examined the effect of grazing, reserve size and tree clearing on the health of these Western slopes Woodlands and found that larger areas supported a greater diversity of species, and thus, healthier communities, than smaller ones and that grazing heavily influenced the health of them. Most remaining areas of remnant Box gum Woodland vegetation were degraded by disturbances like clearing and introduced species and the fragmentation that has occurred by wholesale landscape changes to support farming, in such a rich agricultural area. Reserves, like Livingstone National Park, which have an intact tree layer and understorey or ground layer, with limited disturbance, are not very common. Furthermore, the size of Livingstone National Park and the diversity of vegetation types, and thus, the flora and fauna species its supports, makes this an important conservation reserve for the South West slopes.

We see in the history above, that it was recognised early on that Livingstone was unique, it was described as only one of the remaining examples of this forest type left. The importance and potential for conservation offered by this reserve for declining woodland plants and animals, is even more obvious 100 years later. Even so, Livingstone National Park and State Conservation Area was not protected with National Park status until 2001, despite these requests in the 1970s.

Examples of some types of box gum woodlands are all but gone, such as the rare "little disturbed" remnants of Grassy White Box Woodland, which are mainly confined to rural cemeteries where grazing and other disturbances have been minimal. This near removal of entire ecological communities, such as the South West Slopes Box gum Woodlands, can greatly pressure some individual species. These species now exist very sporadically, in tenuous populations, scattered over a large region. Examples of species which have been recorded in Livingstone National Park that now exist in isolated and vulnerable pockets, are the Yass daisy (Ammobium craspedioides) and the endangered Bush stone-curlew (Burhinus grallarius).

Michael and Lindenmayer (2012) look at the idea of islands of habitat rising out of a vast cleared landscape of the South West Slopes, as they consider rocky outcrops in the region. The rapid elevation of rocky outcrops, rising out of the plains, creates a wide variety of habitat niches for great diversity. They describe a similar vegetation as Livingstone National Park (White box-Yellow box-Blakely's red gum), along with the tall shrubland found on most outcrops. Michael and Lindenmayer discuss similar management challenges, to those faced by Livingstone National Park and highlighted by Prober and Thiele, when considering the improvement of condition for vulnerable species.

The fact that Livingstone National Park is a large area in this cleared landscape means that natural processes can occur relatively unhampered and sanctuary is provided to threatened species. Livingstone's size means that it is less susceptible to problems experienced by smaller remnants, such as increased weed invasion and edge effects, whereby predators and weather effects infiltrate the edges of reserves and degrade them. However being an island of habitat in the middle of an agricultural matrix does present its own set of problems, especially for small vulnerable populations and those isolated pockets of species which are dwindling dangerously low across the landscape. Barriers to movement can decrease breeding opportunities for these populations, leading to reduced gene pools and further declining numbers.

=== Fauna ===
This large remnant of native vegetation, amongst productive farmland, forms part of the important feeding area for Swift parrots (Lathamus discolour) when they leave Tasmania each winter, for the mainland, in search of nectar and lerp insects. The small population (less than 2500 individuals) has a huge area (1 250 000 km^{2}) and shows potential for site fidelity, or repeat visitation, meaning sites like Livingstone National Park, are vital areas for conserving this species.

The Swift parrot is classified as endangered in both NSW and at a national level (under Commonwealth Environment and Biodiversity Protection Act 1999 and the NSW Threatened species conservation Act 1995). Along with international recognition under the International Union for Conservation of Nature (IUCN) Red List of Threatened Species (IUCN 2004).

Identifying the habitat of, and monitoring its condition, is an important conservation action in the National recovery plan for the Swift Parrot. The protection status of Livingstone National Park means management is consistent with and intends to deliver the actions in recovery plans for conserving the Swift Parrots overwintering ground, when it leaves breeding grounds in Tasmania and disperses widely over the mainland, from Victoria to Queensland. Birdlife Australia coordinate a long running and successful volunteer monitoring program, which provides the resources to find the small number of birds over its widespread mainland habitat. This program can provide lessons for the conservation of wide-ranging migratory species such as the Swift parrot. It is conducted alongside the Regent Honeyeater National Recovery plan and monitoring program, as both species occupy a similar niche. The regent honeyeater is also an endangered species which uses the Livingstone National Park for part of its seasonal requirements.

Ironbark (Eucalyptus sideroxylon) is particularly important for the Swift Parrot and the fact that it has been selectively removed from the landscape in the South West Slopes, means that areas such as Livingstone National Park, which retain this vegetation type, are noted by Birdlife Australia for their habitat quality for this dwindling species. Birdlife Australia consider the South West Slopes an Important Bird Area, because of this overwintering habitat for the Swift Parrot.

Livingstone National Park is also recognised within the South West Slopes Important Bird Area as breeding habitat for the Superb Parrot (Polytelis swainsonii), a vulnerable species. Birdlife Australia draws on research from Manning et al., (2004, 2006, and 2007) to show that the Superb Parrot is a species which presents some evidence of moving its range around in response to habitat change. The authors describe the South West slopes as an important habitat zone for this endemic species, and suggest this may be so due to degradation in other parts of its traditional breeding and foraging range. In this area (but not others), the Superb Parrot forages and nests in Box Gum Woodlands. The Superb Parrot is at home in the modified and cleared agricultural areas, due to its preference for scattered paddock trees.

In the South West Slopes, the Superb Parrots favours Blakely's red gum trees (Eucalyptus blakelyi) that are dead, older and larger. Again the preservation of these preferred trees in Livingstone National Park and particularly the retention of dead trees due to its reserve status is important to this species in the landscape. The Superb Parrot, while able to potentially move in response to fluctuations, shows a repeat visitation pattern to nesting sites, or site fidelity. Even though it is tolerable of, and prefers the more scattered environment of the agricultural environment, the clearing of large hollow bearing trees, required for nesting has contributed to its decline. This preference for Blakely's red gum maybe due to this trees tendency to produces more hollows than other trees. Livingstone National Park and State Conservation Area, with a long history of preservation, allows the long timeframe needed to form hollows and replace them, in this production landscape. It offers some respite from the cleaning up sentiment that often sees dead trees and other important habitat components removed.

The Bush Stone Curlew is another species left vulnerable by habitat destruction and this cleaning up tendency. It relies on litter and debri for camouflage at the vulnerable fledging stage and is highly susceptible to fox predation. Its presence in Livingstone National Park is also likely due to the retention of these features when they were being removed from much of the landscape.

== Management ==
Climate change will inevitably bring new challenges to already pressured ecosystems, like Box gum Woodlands, and for Australia's vulnerable endemic species, such as regular visitors to Livingstone National Park, the Superb Parrot and the Swift Parrot. These species are already overwhelmed by fragmentation and changes to their habitat and Livingstone National Park provides a rare respite from these pressures, in such a heavily modified landscape which does not provide the continuity of habitat needed for these species to flourish.

When considering the role of Australia's protected reserve system on biodiversity conservation as climate change eventuates, Mackey, et al. expect the range shifts for various Australian species by mid-century to be in the vicinity of ten km. They highlight that some 45% of Australian vertebrates experience substantial reduction in some part of their natural range. Like other observations in the world the range of species is expected to contract with climate change predictions, follow movement patterns along latitudinal shifts, or follow pathways to higher elevations, in response to new temperature gradients.

In their Australian reserve system review Mackey et al., highlight the importance of intact habitat, movement pathways and refuges for species, as our climate changes more rapidly than ever before, due to human impacts. They use several Australian examples of refugia, including refuge for fire sensitive species. The potential for Rocky outcrops to provide refugia for fire sensitive species is discussed by Michael and Lindenmayer in their South West study, which encompasses habitat similar to that described in Livingstone National Park.

Livingstone National Park has great potential as an area to harbour species as the climate progressively warms. It lies in the landscape between the Riverina Plains and the South West Slopes, an area which allows species to move along the west to east climate gradient and rise in elevation in response to range movement over time. Livingstone National Park, and other isolated pockets of vegetation in the South West Slopes, also form and important area of intermingling. There is distinct East, West and North South changes in vegetation as the different biogeographical regions of vegetation come together here. Such areas allow large scale natural processes to occur, relatively free from edge effects and substantial exotic species invasion. It is here that species can mix, adapt and evolve to meet this climate driven challenge, which will occur at a more rapid pace than in history.

Livingstone National Park and State Conservation Area, with their somewhat accidental conservation history, are now important biodiversity refuge areas for the South West Slopes, as once widespread compositions of vegetation have been heavily cleared, to support what is now a vital food production landscape. Whilst current management supports the management of the reserve for threatened species and to protect natural values within the reserve, linkages to the outside may become the essential element for long-term survival of many species as climate change pressures them.

Vegetation corridor linkages and 'stepping stones' overcome problems with reduced genetic material, which can derail small populations. This occurs as species dwindle and even large areas, like Livingstone National Park, become isolated by cleared land, which flora and fauna are unable to move across. Neighbouring corridor linkages are lower on the priority scale for current management, even though this is recognised as a positive action in the Livingstone National Park Plan of Management.

Working with neighbours and other agencies who would like to extend these connections are important and could be reconsidered in the Management Plan, to ensure these threatened species have the available landscape needed to see through the challenge of climate change. Along with protecting existing species; providing links for species to mix genetic material; reducing threatening processes, such as invasive and predatory species; and restoring landscape scale processes, such as ecological fire regimes, are all considered important steps to allow Australian species the space they need to develop local adaptions to climate change. Some of these vulnerable species present in Livingstone, like the Superb Parrot, show they are susceptible to the effects of a changed climate as they have a noted response to resources available due to weather effects.

== See also ==
- Protected areas of New South Wales
