= South Western Slopes =

Bioregion in New South Wales, Australia

- Region
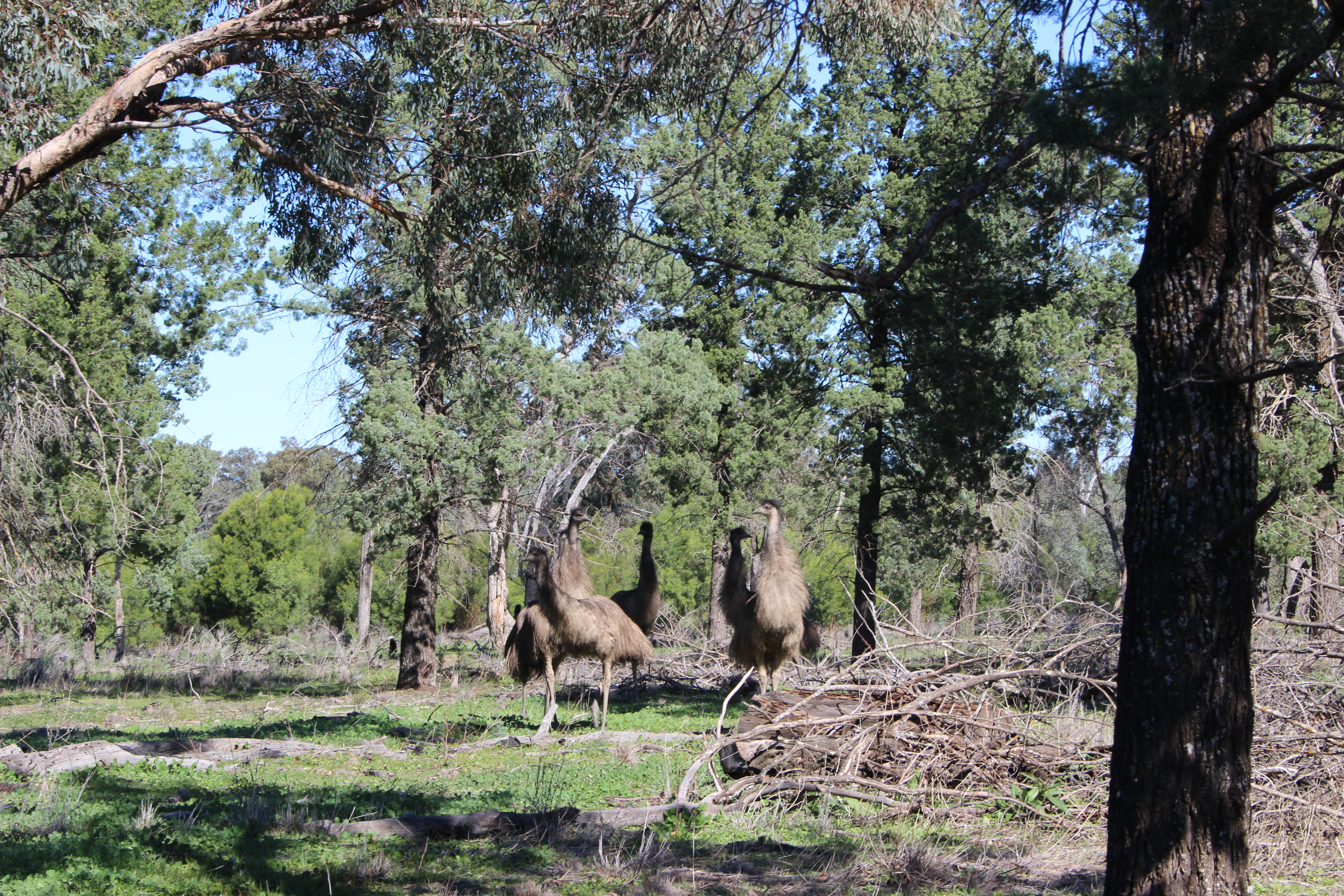
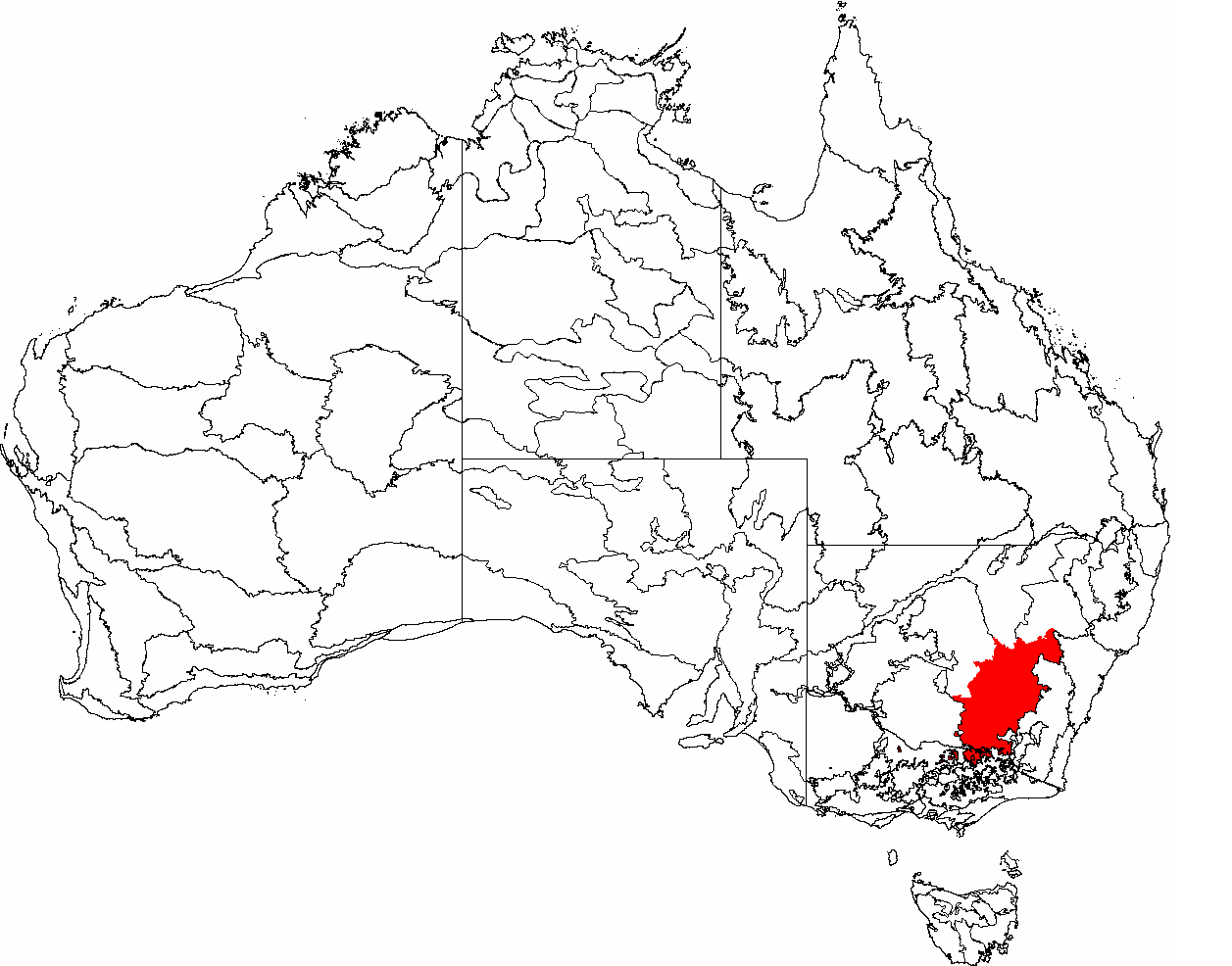
- Emus in Weddin Mountains National Park The interim Australian bioregions, with South Western Slopes in red
- Country: Australia
- State: New South Wales
- LGAs: Snowy Monaro; Snowy Valleys

Government
  - State electorates: Albury; Monaro; Wagga Wagga
  - Federal division: Riverina

Area
  - Total: 86,811.26 km^{2} (33,518.01 sq mi)
Regions around South Western Slopes
Darling Riverine Plains	Brigalow Belt South	Sydney Basin
Cobar Peneplain	South Western Slopes	South Eastern Highlands
Riverina	South Eastern Highlands	South Eastern Highlands

The South Western Slopes, also known as the South West Slopes, is a region predominantly in New South Wales, Australia. It covers the lower inland slopes of the Great Dividing Range, extending from north of Dunedoo through central NSW and into north-east Victoria, meeting its south-western end around Beechworth. More than 90% of the region is in the state of New South Wales and it occupies about 10% of that state – more than 80,000 km^{2}.

== Bioregion ==
The bioregion includes parts of the Murray, Murrumbidgee, Lachlan and Macquarie River catchments.

The bioregion is divided into three sub-regions:

- Inland Slopes subregion (NSS01)
- Lower Slopes subregion (NSS02)
- Capertee Valley subregion (NSS03)

== Climate ==
Mean annual temperatures in the region range from very cool to warm; from just 8 °C (46 °F) up to 17 °C (63 °F) depending on altitude and latitude. The range in annual rainfall is likewise great; from just 400 millimetres (16 in) on the far western plain around Griffith, to as much as 1,700 millimetres (67 in) on the western face of the Snowy Mountains at Cabramurra.

Depending on latitude, rainfall peaks in either winter or spring; the more southern and mountainous areas show a distinct winter peak, as opposed to one of springtime. High summer to mid autumn is usually the driest period and is prone to severe drought.

Snow is common on the higher slopes above an altitude of approximately 600 metres (2,000 ft) in the southern boundary of the region; and above 1,000 metres (3,300 ft) in the northern boundary, but may occur as low as 300 metres (980 ft) or less. Snow has been recorded on several occasions to fall and settle as low as Albury and Wagga Wagga, 165 metres (541 ft) and 180 metres (590 ft) respectively; and on three occasions as low as Narrandera to the north-west, 145 metres (476 ft). Sleet is a regular occurrence throughout the higher parts of the region, and occurs even in the lowland areas – especially in the south.

This region features the greatest seasonal range of maximum temperatures than any other in Australia, with some places ranging as much as 20 °C in maximum temperatures between January and July. This is due to being windward of the Great Dividing Range, with the prevailing westerly airmasses and accompanying cloud cover bringing low maximum temperatures in winter; and the far inland location, prolonging heatwaves in summer. These areas have a climate that is more similar to that of Adelaide and Perth, than the proximate cities like Sydney and Wollongong, with their wet winters and relatively dry summers.

=== Forecast area for Bureau of Meteorology ===
The South West Slopes forecast area used by the Bureau of Meteorology includes only a region stretching approximately between Young and Tumbarumba from north to south. The area is much smaller than that defined as a bioregion by the NSW National Parks & Wildlife Service, as the Bureau of Meteorology has split this bioregion into three additional forecast districts: the Central West Slopes & Plains, constituting the northern parts of the bioregion; as well as North East (Victoria) and Riverina, which constitute the remaining south and west of the bioregion.

== Flora and fauna ==
Most of the site is modified wheat-growing and sheep-grazing country with only vestiges of its original vegetation. Remnant patches of woodland and scattered large trees, especially of mugga ironbark, apple box, grey box, white box, yellow box, red box, yellow gum, river red gum and Blakely's red gum, still provide habitat for the parrots. Protected areas within the site include several nature reserves and state forests, as well as the Livingstone and Weddin Mountains National Parks, and Tarcutta Hills Reserve.

=== Important Bird Area ===
An area of 25,653 square kilometres (9,905 sq mi), largely coincident with the bioregion, has been identified by BirdLife International as the South-west Slopes of NSW Important Bird Area (IBA) because it supports a significant wintering population of endangered swift parrots and most of the largest population of vulnerable superb parrots, as well as populations of painted honeyeaters and diamond firetails.

== Protected areas ==
The South Western Slopes of NSW are some of the most highly cleared and altered lands in the state. Native vegetation remains generally only in small, isolated patches. Substantial clearing continues. Less than 2% of the bioregion is protected as reserves. Conservation efforts are focussing on landholder stewardship agreements.

- National Parks: Benambra National Park, Conimbla National Park, Goobang National Park, Jindalee National Park, Livingstone National Park, Minjary National Park, Nangar National Park, Weddin Mountains National Park, Woomargama National Park
- Nature reserves: Avisford Nature Reserve, Big Bush Nature Reserve, Boginderra Hills Nature Reserve, Buddigower Nature Reserve, Burrinjuck Nature Reserve, Copperhannia Nature Reserve, Dananbilla Nature Reserve, Dapper Nature Reserve, Downfall Nature Reserve, Ellerslie Nature Reserve, Eugowra Nature Reserve, Flagstaff Memorial Nature Reserve, Ingalba Nature Reserve, Koorawatha Nature Reserve, Mudjarn Nature Reserve, Mullengandra Nature Reserve, Munghorn Gap Nature Reserve, Narrandera Nature Reserve, Nest Hill Nature Reserve, Pucawan Nature Reserve, Razorback Nature Reserve, Tabletop Nature Reserve, The Charcoal Tank Nature Reserve, The Rock Nature Reserve, Ulandra Nature Reserve, Wiesners Swamp Nature Reserve
- Historic sites: Hill End Historic Site, Yuranighs Aboriginal Grave Historic Site

== Human settlement ==
The South Western Slopes were occupied by the Wiradjuri people, the largest Aboriginal language group in NSW.

Notable towns and cities within the bioregion, from Beechworth in the south-west to Dunedoo in the north-east, include Wodonga, Albury, Corryong, Tumbarumba, Batlow, Narrandera, Wagga Wagga, Junee, Tumut, Gundagai, Cootamundra, Temora, West Wyalong, Grenfell, Young, Cowra, Forbes, Parkes, Wellington and Mudgee. Griffith, Leeton and Condobolin lay just outside the western boundary; while Orange, Crookwell and Yass lay just outside the eastern boundary of the bioregion. The highland regions nearer the Great Divide can also be considered a part of the South Eastern Highlands bioregion.

Local government areas included in the bioregion:

- Mid-Western Regional Council – townships of Rylstone (on the border) and Mudgee
- Dubbo Regional Council
- Cabonne Shire including the town of Molong
- Parkes Shire
- Forbes Shire
- Weddin Shire including the town of Grenfell
- Bland Shire, including the town of West Wyalong
- Narrandera Shire in the central Riverina
- Hilltops Council including the town of Young
- Temora Shire
- Cootamundra-Gundagai Regional Council
- Snowy Valleys Council
- City of Wagga Wagga
- City of Albury
- Greater Hume Shire
- Shire of Towong in north-east Victoria
- Shire of Indigo, on the boundary between north-east and north-central Victoria
