= Weddin =

Weddin may refer to:

- Weddin Mountains National Park
- Weddin Shire

== See also ==
- Wedding
