= Wiesners Swamp Nature Reserve =

Protected area in New South Wales, Australia

- IUCN category Ia (strict nature reserve)
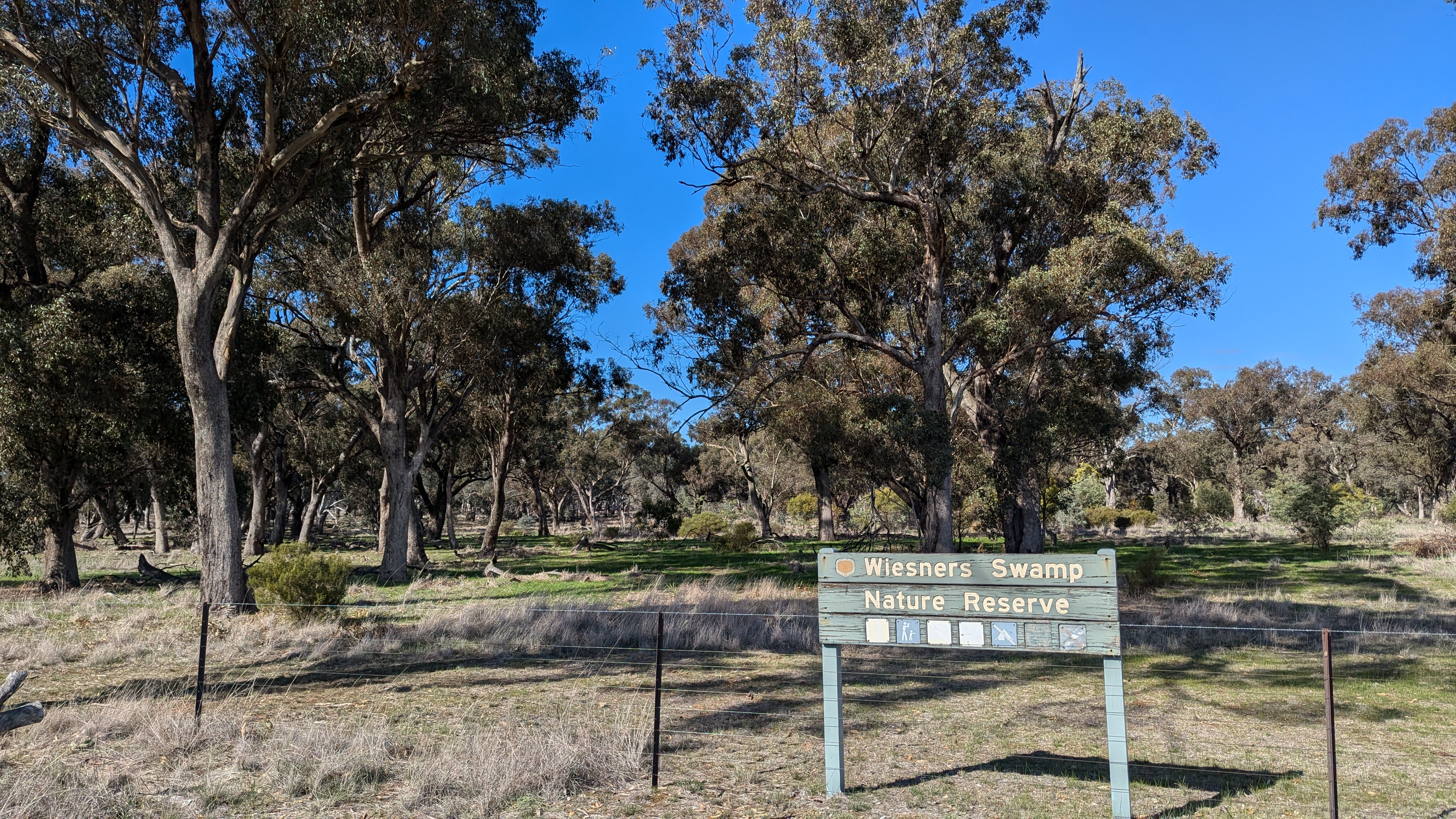

- Location within New South Wales
- Location: New South Wales
- Nearest city: Walbundrie
- Coordinates: 35°40′04″S 146°47′52.5″E
- Area: 1.03 km^{2} (0.40 sq mi)
- Established: 4 April 1996
- Governing body: NSW National Parks & Wildlife Service
- Website: Official website

Wiesners Swamp Nature Reserve is a protected nature reserve, located in the South Western Slopes region of New South Wales, in eastern Australia. The 103 ha (250-acre) reserve is located approximately 8 km (5.0 mi) northeast of Walbundrie, and 50 km (31 mi) northwest of Albury.

== History ==
The reserve lies within Wiradjuri country, however little is known about its historic significance to Aboriginal people. The swamp is likely to have been an important reliable source of water and game.

The area around the reserve was settled during the 1830s by European squatters, with Wiesners Swamp selected as part of Walla Walla Station. In 1883, the area of the nature reserve was excised from Walla Walla Station to become two Crown forest reserves. From the early 1900s, the wetland within the reserve became known as Wiesner Swamps, due to the Wiesner (pronounced "weezner") family purchasing the property adjacent to the reserve. From 1975 there were proposals to gazette the swamp as a state game reserve or as a nature reserve for its value as a wetland and remnant woodland, with the area proclaimed a nature reserve in April 1996.

== Environment ==
The nature reserve comprises a large low-lying area of ephemeral wetland (Wiesners Swamp) and small areas of gently sloping land above regular flood level on the north-western, south-western and north-eastern corners. Wiesners Swamp lies in a depression on the Billabong Creek floodplain, and is located in the headwaters of Simmons Creek, which flows into Billabong Creek.

Most of the swamp is contained within the nature reserve but small areas extend outside on the western, northern and southern boundaries. The swamp fills from drainage lines on the south-eastern and northern boundaries and drains to the west.

The water table beneath the reserve lies about 4 metres (13 ft) below the surface, and is highly saline.

=== Flora ===
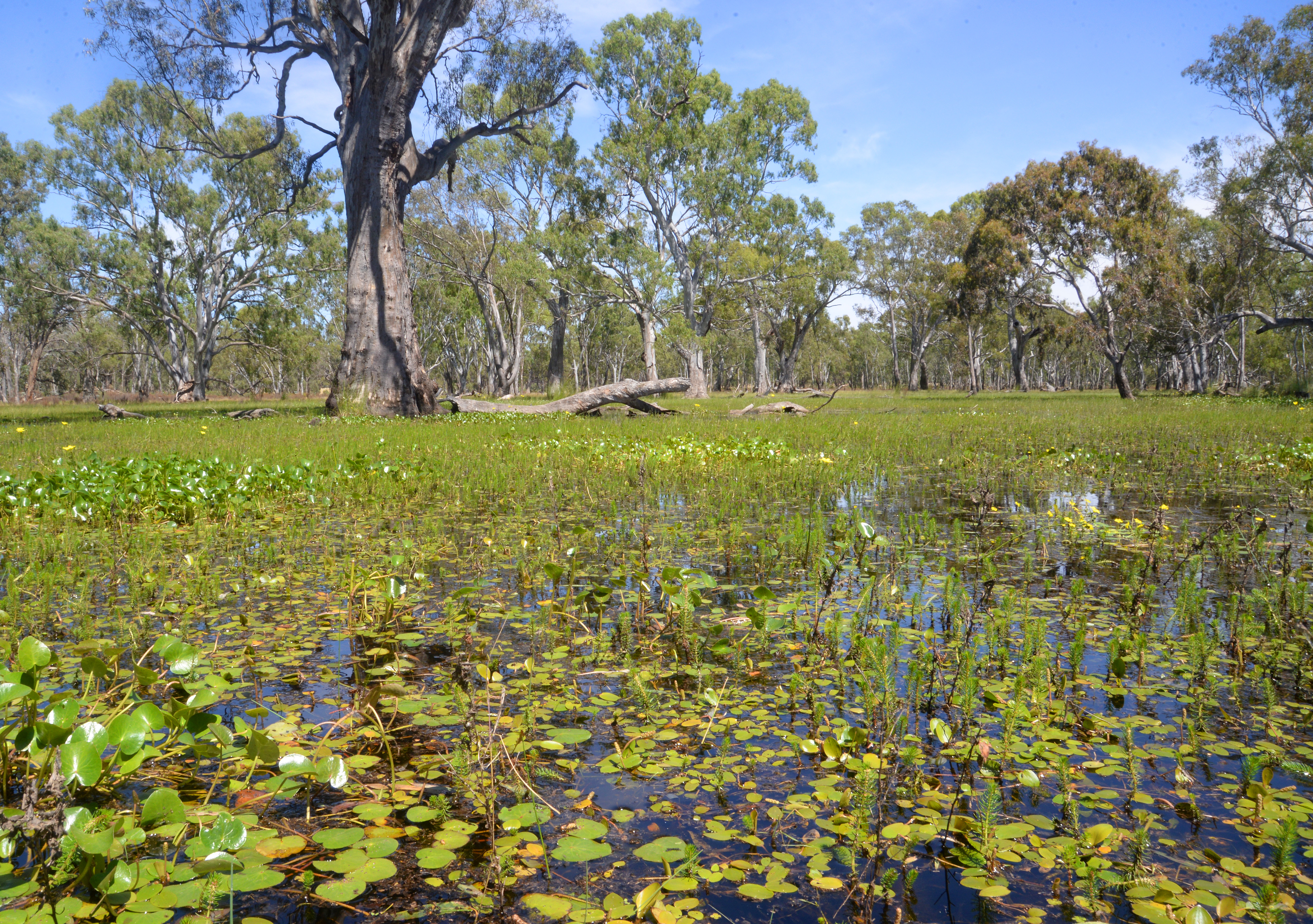
River red gum wetland

116 plant species have been recorded within the reserve, of which 48 are introduced. Most of the forest within the reserve is river red gum woodland. Other large tree species present within the reserve include white box, grey box, yellow box and bulloak.

The reserve has limited native vegetation structure in the midstorey and understorey due to historic clearing and livestock grazing.

Native aquatic plant species recorded within the reserve include spiny flatsedge, common spikerush, rushes, red water-milfoil, water ribbons, swamp lily and blunt pondweed.

=== Fauna ===
Fifty species of birds, have been recorded within the reserve, including Australian reed warbler, Australian white ibis, brown treecreeper, dollarbird, mistletoebird, sacred kingfisher, swamp harrier, tawny frogmouth, white-necked heron, white-plumed honeyeater, yellow-billed spoonbill, zebra finch. Mammal species recorded within the nature reserve include eastern grey kangaroo, common brushtail possum and common ringtail possum. Reptiles and amphibians recorded in the reserve include eastern brown snake, lace monitor, spotted marsh frog and Peron's tree frog.

Introduced pest species found within the reserve include European rabbit, brown hare, European fox, feral cat, common starling, European carp and eastern mosquitofish.

== See also ==
- Protected areas of New South Wales
