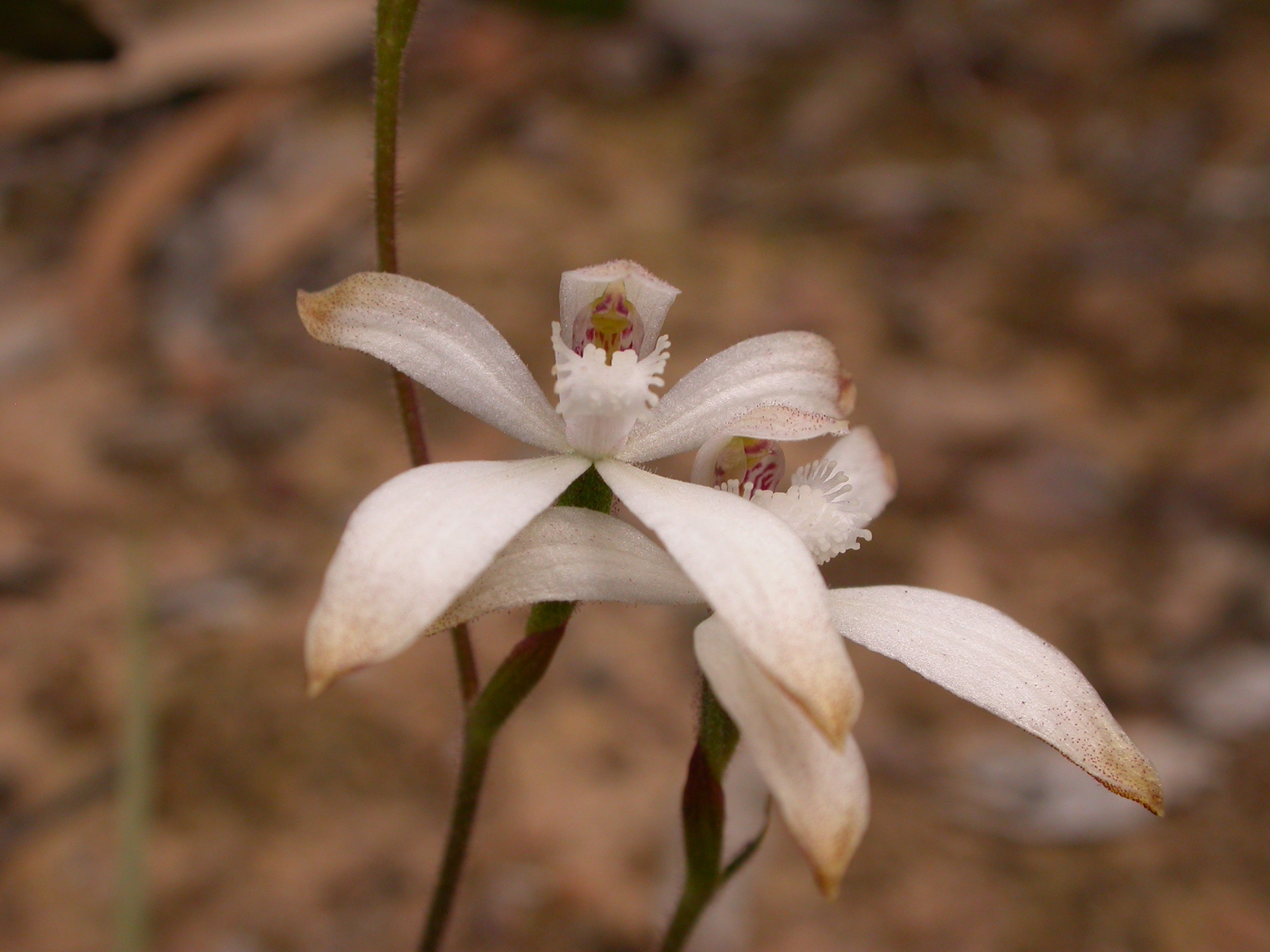
- On Black Mountain

Scientific classification
- Kingdom: Plantae
- Clade: Embryophytes
- Clade: Tracheophytes
- Clade: Spermatophytes
- Clade: Angiosperms
- Clade: Monocots
- Order: Asparagales
- Family: Orchidaceae
- Subfamily: Orchidoideae
- Tribe: Diurideae
- Genus: Caladenia
- Species: C. ustulata

Binomial name
- Caladenia ustulata (D.L.Jones) G.N.Backh.

= Caladenia ustulata =

Brown caps

Species of orchid

Caladenia ustulata, commonly known as brown caps, is a plant in the orchid family Orchidaceae and is endemic to New South Wales and the Australian Capital Territory. It was first formally described in 2007 by David Jones who gave it the name Stegostyla ustulata and published the description in The Orchadian. In 2010 Gary Backhouse changed the name to Caladenia ustulata and published the change in The Victorian Naturalist. The specific epithet (ustulata) is a Latin word meaning "scorched", "singed" or "browned". Brown caps occurs in the southern tablelands and south-west slopes, which includes the Australian Capital Territory.
