= Mount Ulandra =

Mountain in New South Wales, Australia

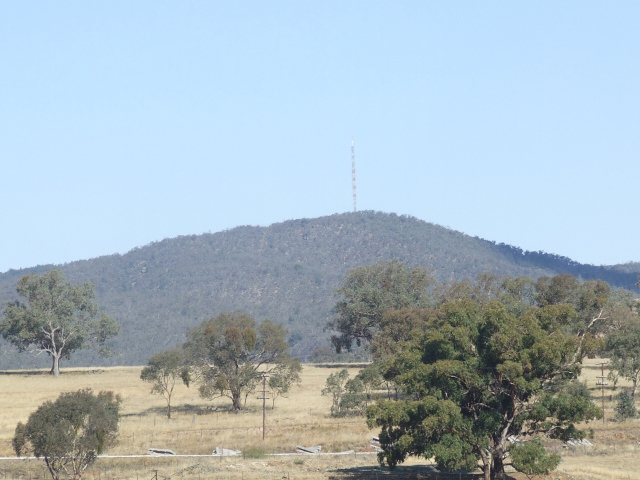
- Mount Ulandra from the Olympic Highway near the village of Bethungra

Highest point
- Elevation: 761 m (2,497 ft)
- Coordinates: 34°49′13″S 147°54′06″E

Geography
- Location within New South Wales
- Location: Ulandra Nature Reserve, South West Slopes region, New South Wales, Australia

Climbing
- Easiest route: Road via the Olympic Highway

Mount Ulandra is a mountain with an elevation of 761 metres (2,497 ft) AHD that is located within the Ulandra Nature Reserve in the South West Slopes region of New South Wales, Australia.

The mountain is located approximately 25 kilometres (16 mi) south-west of Cootamundra and 4 kilometres (2.5 mi) south-east of Bethungra. Atop the mountain are telecommunications towers, including television broadcast towers for all television networks covering much of the Riverina region. The reserve is located on the western hills of the Southern Tablelands. To the west of the reserve lies an undulating 200–300 metres (660–980 ft) above sea level plain which rises abruptly at Mount Ulandra's summit. The reserve was dedicated in 1981 to protect stands of Cootamundra wattle.
