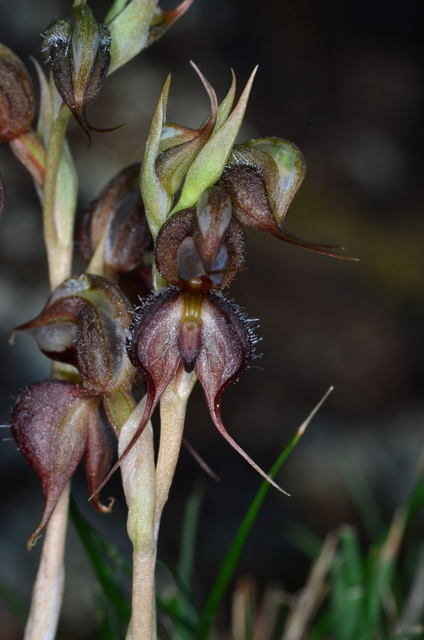
- Pterostylis boormanii growing in the Weddin Mountains National Park

Scientific classification
- Kingdom: Plantae
- Clade: Tracheophytes
- Clade: Angiosperms
- Clade: Monocots
- Order: Asparagales
- Family: Orchidaceae
- Subfamily: Orchidoideae
- Tribe: Cranichideae
- Genus: Pterostylis
- Species: P. boormanii

Binomial name
- Pterostylis boormanii Rupp

Synonyms
- Oligochaetochilus boormanii (Rupp) Szlach.

= Pterostylis boormanii =

Sikh's whiskers

Species of orchid

Pterostylis boormanii, commonly known as the Sikh's whiskers, baggy britches, or Boorroans green-hood is a plant in the orchid family Orchidaceae and is endemic to south-eastern Australia. It has a rosette of leaves and up to seven dark reddish-brown flowers with translucent "windows" and a thick, brown, bristly, insect-like labellum.

== Description ==
Pterostylis boormanii, is a terrestrial, perennial, deciduous, herb with an underground tuber. It has a rosette of between eight and fourteen elliptic leaves at the base of the flowering spike, each leaf 15–35 mm (0.6–1 in) long and 8–14 mm (0.3–0.6 in) wide. The leaves are usually withered by flowering time. Up to seven dark reddish-brown flowers with translucent windows and 27–30 mm (1.1–1.2 in) long, 10–12 mm (0.4–0.5 in) wide are borne on a flowering spike 50–200 mm (2–8 in) tall. Two to five stem leaves are wrapped around the flowering spike. The dorsal sepal and petals form a hood or "galea" over the column with the dorsal sepal having an upturned, thread-like tip 8–10 mm (0.3–0.4 in) long. The lateral sepals turn downwards, are wider than the galea, have thickened hairy edges and suddenly taper to narrow tips 10–15 mm (0.4–0.6 in) long which spread apart from each other. The labellum is thick, brown and insect-like, 4–5 mm (0.16–0.20 in) long and about 2 mm (0.08 in) wide. The "head" end has many short hairs and the "body" has five to eight hairs up to 4 mm (0.2 in) long on each side. Flowering occurs from September to November.

== Taxonomy and naming ==
Pterostylis boormanii was first formally described in 1944 by Herman Rupp from a specimen collected near Peak Hill and the description was published in his book Orchids of New South Wales. The specific epithet (boormanii) honours the collector of the type specimen, John Boorman.

== Distribution and habitat ==
Sikh's whiskers grows in drier forest and scrub, often in rocky places and in association with Callitris species. It occurs in New South Wales south from Narrabri, across inland Victoria and in the south-east of South Australia in areas receiving an average annual rainfall of 250–500 mm (10–20 in).
