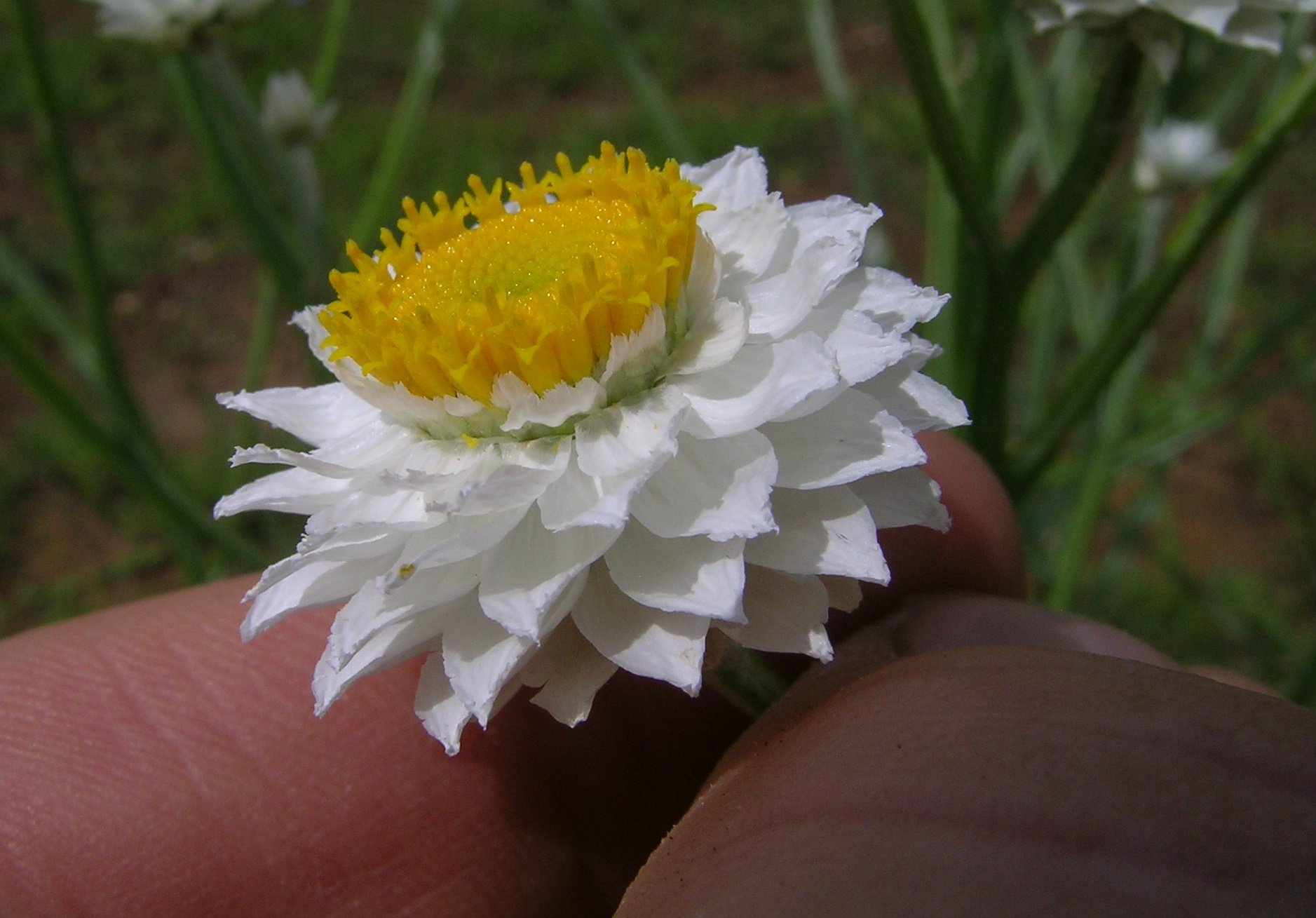

Scientific classification
- Kingdom: Plantae
- Clade: Tracheophytes
- Clade: Angiosperms
- Clade: Eudicots
- Clade: Asterids
- Order: Asterales
- Family: Asteraceae
- Genus: Ammobium
- Species: A. alatum

Binomial name
- Ammobium alatum R.Br.

Synonyms
- Ammobium alatum R.Br. f. alatum; Ammobium alatum f. grandiflorum Siebert & Voss; Ammobium spathulatum Gaudich.; Helichrysum alatum (R.Br.) Baill.; Ixodia ammobium Spreng. nom. illeg.

= Ammobium alatum =

Species of plant

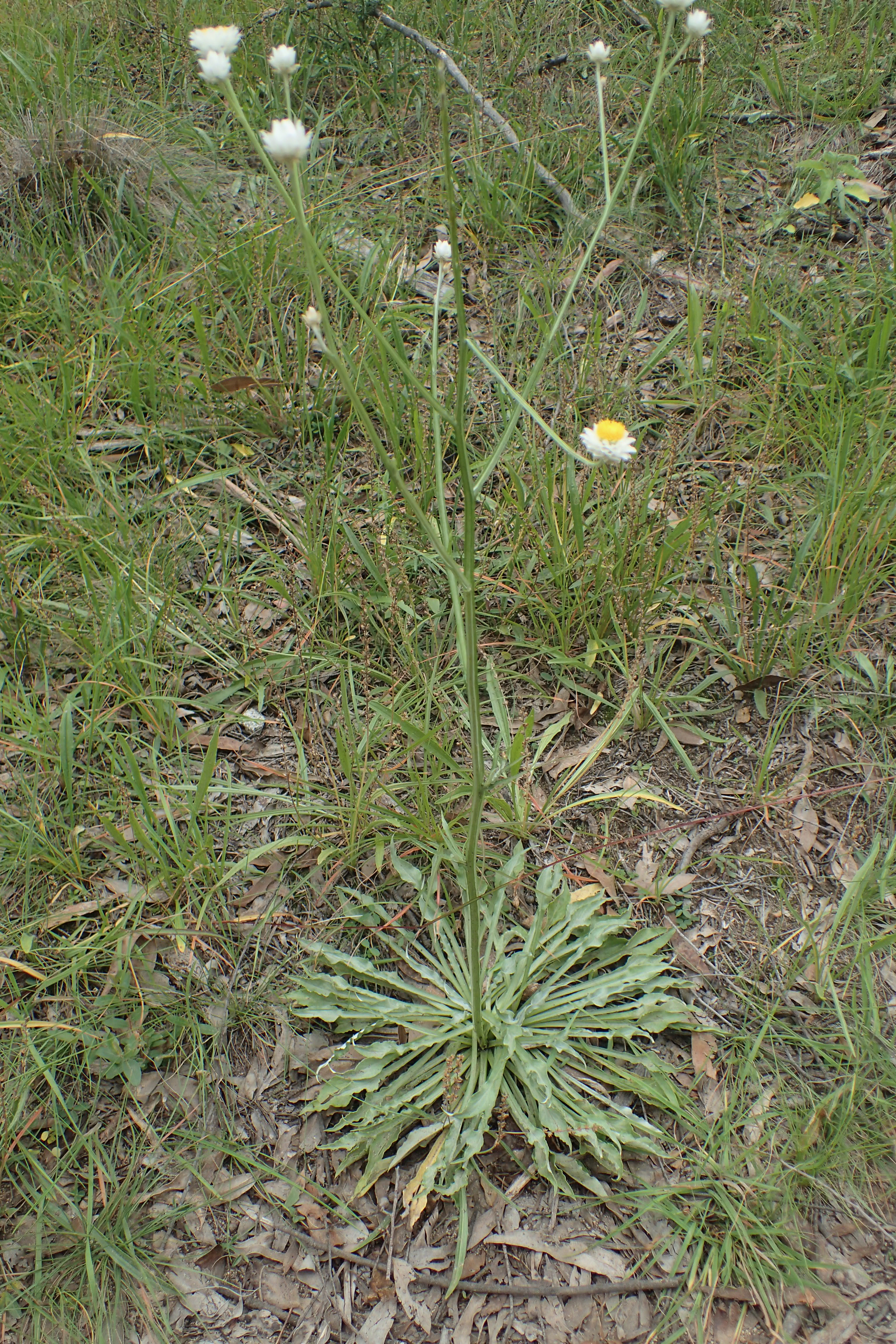
Habit

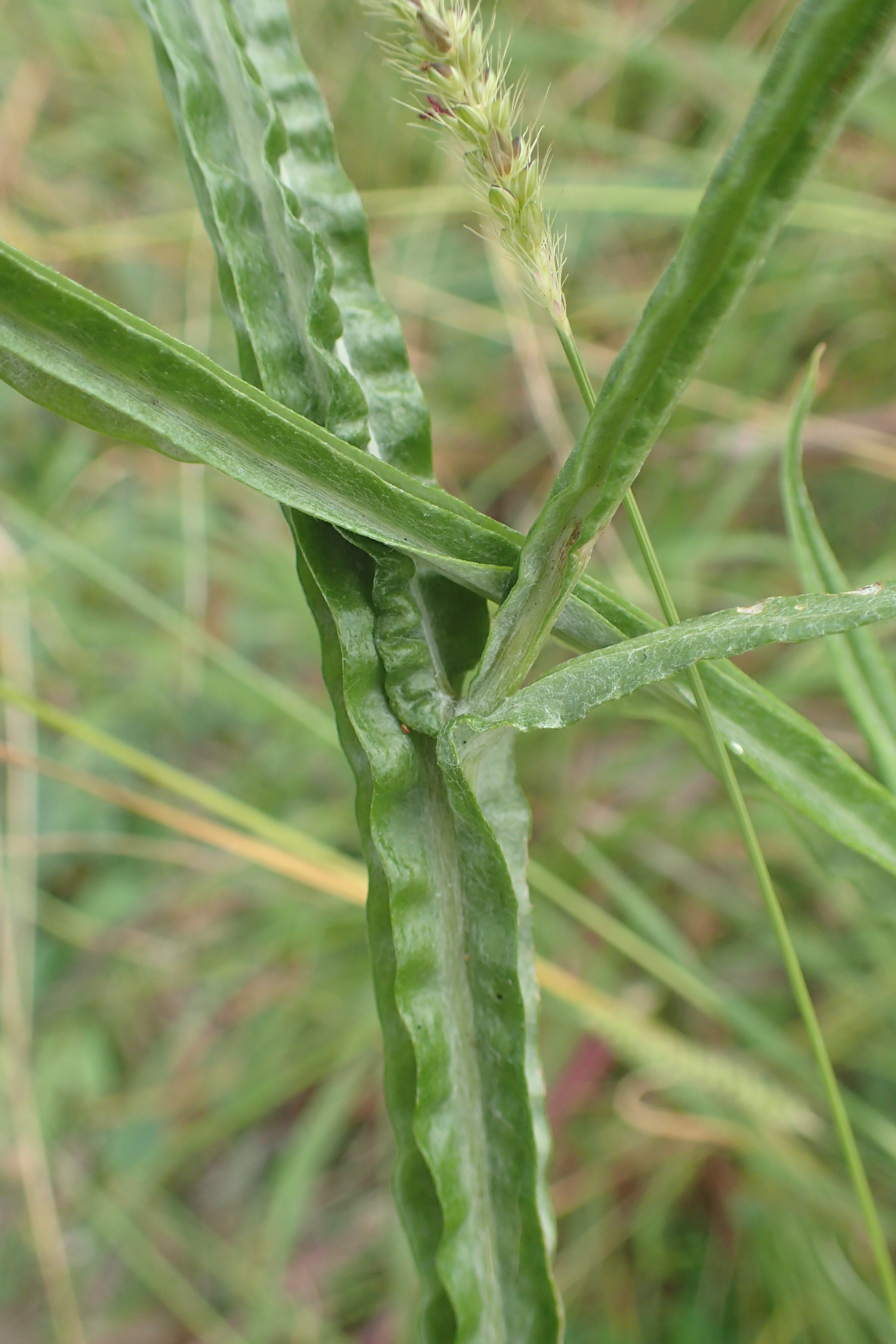
Stem detail

Ammobium alatum, commonly known as the winged everlasting, is a species of perennial herb in the daisy family Asteraceae and is both a native and an introduced species in south-eastern Australia. It has prominently winged stems, most of its leaves at the base, and heads of yellow florets surrounding by papery, white involucral bracts.

== Description ==
Ammobium alatum is a species of perennial herb, occasional an annual, that typically grows to a height of 60–100 cm (24–39 in) with winged, woolly-hairy, usually much-branched stems. Most of its leaves are at the base of the plant and are narrow egg-shaped to narrow triangular. The basal leaves are 40–60 mm (1.6–2.4 in) long and 10–15 mm (0.39–0.59 in) wide on a petiole 70–100 mm (2.8–3.9 in) long. There are a few sessile, bract-like leaves on the stems. The flowers are 10–20 mm (0.39–0.79 in) wide with bright yellow florets that become darker with age, the corolla about 5 mm (0.20 in) long. The florets are surrounded by papery, white involucral bracts 5–10 mm (0.20–0.39 in) long with jagged edges. Flowering mainly occurs from November to April and the cypselas are linear, wrinkled and dark brown with an awn up to 1 mm (0.039 in) long.

== Taxonomy and naming ==
The genus Ammobium and Ammobium alatum were first described in 1824 Robert Brown in Curtis's Botanical Magazine. The name Ammobium is from the Greek words, ammos ("sand") and bios (" life"), describing the genus as growing in sand, and the specific epithet alatum is from the Latin alatus meaning "winged" in reference to its winged stems.

== Distribution and habitat ==
The winged everlasting often grows in disturbed environments such as on roadsides and agricultural land, and sometimes on riverbanks where the seeds have been carried from disturbed areas. Records of this species in natural habitats are from eucalypt forests in plateau and rocky cliffs in northern New South Wales, from river banks in the upper Snowy River in Victoria, from the Northern Tablelands and North West Slopes of New South Wales and from south-east Queensland. Robert Brown found it "growing plentifully near the shores of Port Hunter (or the Coal River) in New South Wales" in 1804. The species is naturalised in South Australia, The Australian Capital Territory and Tasmania, and in places outside its natural distribution in New South Wales.
