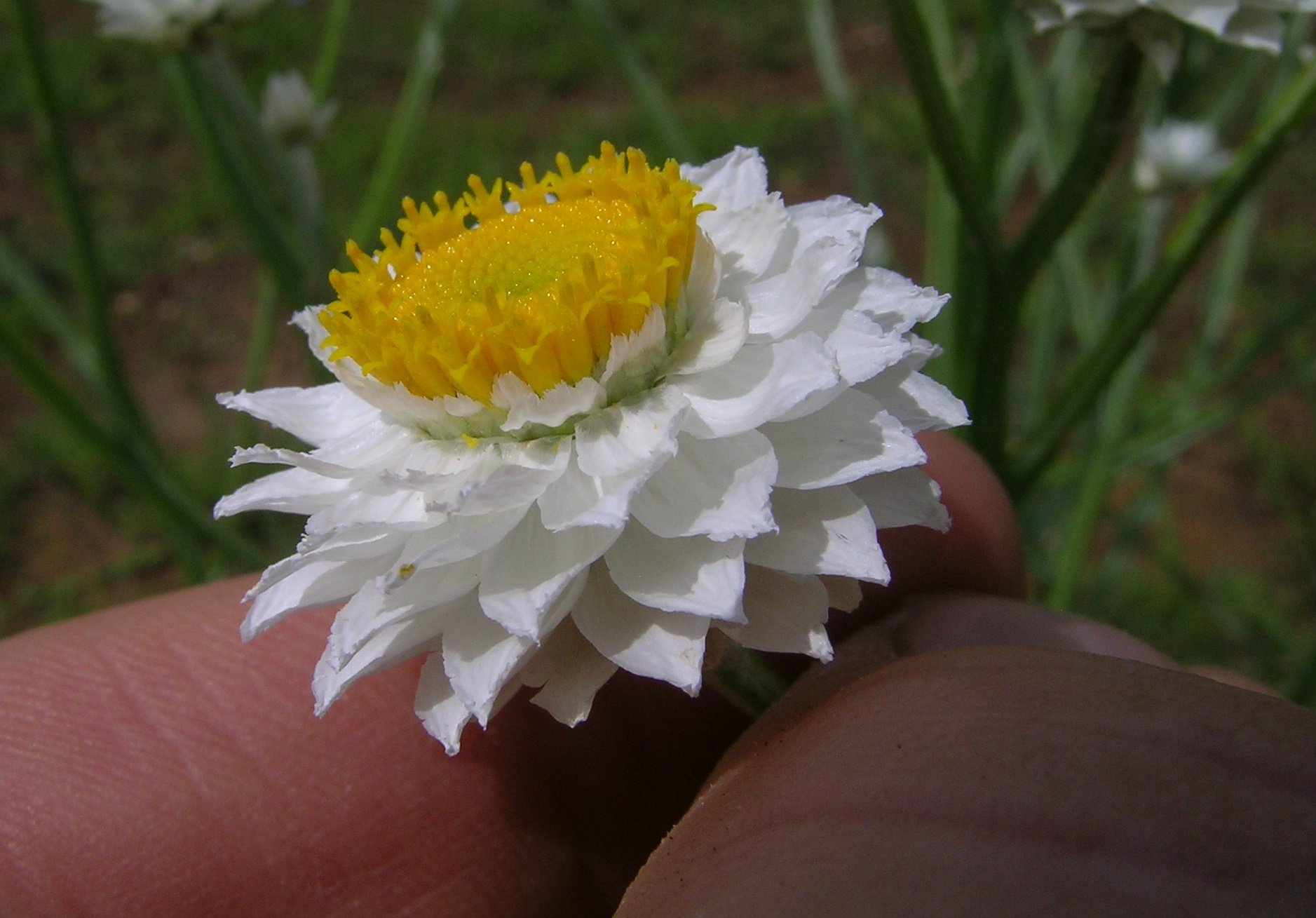
- Ammobium alatum

Scientific classification
- Kingdom: Plantae
- Clade: Embryophytes
- Clade: Tracheophytes
- Clade: Spermatophytes
- Clade: Angiosperms
- Clade: Eudicots
- Clade: Asterids
- Order: Asterales
- Family: Asteraceae
- Subfamily: Asteroideae
- Tribe: Gnaphalieae
- Genus: Ammobium; R.Br. ex Sims

Type species
- Ammobium alatum R.Br.

Synonyms
- Nablonium Cass.; Helichrysum sect. Ammobium (R.Br.) Baillon

= Ammobium =

Genus of plants

Ammobium is genus of perennial Asteraceae species described as a genus in 1824 by Robert Brown, with the type species being Ammobium alatum.

Ammobium is native to eastern Australia.

Species

- Ammobium alatum R.Br. - New South Wales, Queensland, Victoria, Tasmania, South Australia
- Ammobium craspedioides Benth. - New South Wales
