= Matt Lloyd (footballer) =

Australian rules footballer (born 1965)

Personal information
- Full name: Matthew Lloyd
- Born: 9 August 1965 (age 61)
- Original team: Mangoplah - Cookardinia United
- Height: 180 cm (5 ft 11 in)
- Weight: 74 kg (163 lb)

Playing career^{1}
Years	Club	Games (Goals)
1987–1991	Sydney Swans	22 (5)
- ^{1} Playing statistics correct to the end of 1991.

Matthew Lloyd (born 9 August 1965) is a former Australian rules footballer who played with the Sydney Swans in the Victorian/Australian Football League (VFL/AFL). He now works in the travel industry.

Lloyd, who grew up in Mangoplah, played originally for Mangoplah Cookardinia United.

After completing his schooling in Wagga Wagga, Lloyd moved to Sydney in 1984 and joined the Swans. He won a reserves best and fairest in 1986 and made his senior debut in Sydney's Round 7 win over reigning premiers Hawthorn in the 1987 VFL season. His nine appearances in 1988 would be the most he played in a single season, and he ended his career with Sydney in 1991 after 22 games.

Lloyd played in a Sydney Football League premiership with Sydney University in 1992 and won the Podbury Medal as "best on ground" in the grand final. The following year he was captain-coach for a season.

In 1995 he played for Old Xaverians.
