= Ingalba, Big Bush and Pucawan Nature Reserves =

Protected area in New South Wales, Australia

Ingalba NR, Big Bush NR, Pucawan NR
- IUCN category Ia (strict nature reserve)
- Location within New South Wales
- Location: New South Wales
- Nearest city: Temora
- Coordinates: 34°31′39″S 147°24′04″E
- Area: 49.27 km^{2} (19.02 sq mi)
- Established: 1970, 1984, 1988
- Governing body: NSW National Parks & Wildlife Service

Ingalba, Big Bush and Pucawan Nature Reserves are three Nature Reserves situated to the west of Temora, New South Wales. Ingalba Nature Reserve is situated 10 kilometres west of Temora and Pucawan Nature Reserve a further 6 km west. Big Bush Nature Reserve is 15 kilometres northwest of Temora. All three reserves are located within Temora Shire. They are managed concurrently by the New South Wales Parks and Wildlife Service. The reserves are linked by corridors of vegetation in adjacent private land and along roads and Travelling Stock Routes.

== History ==
=== Ingalba ===
Ingalba Nature Reserve (4013.5 ha) lies 10 kilometres west of Temora on the Burley Griffin Way, and was gazetted in three stages. On 17 July 1970, 3,440.5 ha. of the former Temora State Forest was gazetted, and further additions followed. On 1 October 1976 (16.19 ha) of the former Trigonometrical Reserve at Wharrun Trig was adjoined to Ingalba, and on 7 January 1983 additional amounts (556.8 ha) were added following the acquisition of private land. Ingalba Nature Reserve is intersected by and excludes the Burley Griffin Way (Griffith– Temora Road) and an easement through the southern part of the reserve east from Kellows Lane.

=== Pucawan ===
Pucawan Nature Reserve (274 ha) is a further 6 km west on the Coolamon Road, and was gazetted on 11 March 1988. Prior to gazettal the area was vacant Crown land, part of which was proclaimed as a Rifle Range.

=== Big Bush ===
Big Bush Nature Reserve (640 ha) is 15 km north-west of Temora on Thanowring Road, 7 km north of Ingalba Nature Reserve, and was gazetted in four stages. On 23 November 1984 the 42.09 ha. of Crown land gazetted as a Native Flora and Fauna Reserve was revoked and proclaimed as Big Bush Nature Reserve. Adjoining private land was purchased and gazetted on 31 January 1986 (67.68 ha.), 30 October 1987 (98.63 ha.) and on 1 October 1999 (431.53 ha.).

== Geology ==
The reserves consist of flat to gently undulating terrain at a slight elevation above the surrounding land. Ingalba Nature Reserve has the most varied topography, containing small drainage lines, and with elevations from 315m to 402m at Mt Wharrun. The other reserves are of slightly lower altitude.

The landscape is characterised by a complex system of sedimentary, volcanic and igneous rocks of the Lachlan Fold Belt. Pucawan Nature Reserve and the southern part of Ingalba Nature Reserve have an Upper Ordovician geology of quartzite, shale, slate, phyllite and schist. There is an indistinct boundary with the Upper Silurian geology predominant in Big Bush and Ingalba Nature Reserves. These areas consist of sandstone, shale, siltstone, slate, conglomerate and limestone, with some volcanics.

Abundant but poorly preserved fossil graptolites are found in a disused quarry in Pucawan Nature Reserve. These fossils (an extinct group of oceanic colonial organisms) have been dated from the late Ordovician period. The soils are of intermediate loamy texture. Crest soils are mostly shallow, with broken shales and siltstone present on the surface. On the gentle slopes and flats, deposition of alluvial materials has produced deeper, dark brown soils. The surrounding cleared land supports rich crops on red-brown earths and red earth soils.

Minor erosion is present in gullies.

== Biology ==
=== Flora ===
Two distinct vegetation communities occur on the reserves: tall open woodland and low open woodland with dry heath. These communities are considered regionally significant due to their remnant status.

The tall woodland vegetation is dominated by mugga ironbark (Eucalyptus sideroxylon) and western grey box (Eucalyptus microcarpa). It also supports white cypress pine (Callitris glaucophylla) on lower slopes, with black cypress pine (Callitris endlicheri) common on upper slopes and ridges. Shrubs include quandong (Santalum acuminatum), native cherry (Exocarpus cupressiformis), rough wattle (Acacia aspera), bent-leaf wattle (Acacia genistifolia), hakea wattle (Acacia hakeoides), and wedge-leaf hopbush (Dodonaea cuneata).

The mugga ironbark - western grey box woodland community was considered to be inadequately conserved in NSW and vulnerable to further loss by Benson in 1989. As there has been little addition to the area conserved since that time, this is still the case.

Dry heathland or low open woodland is found on ridgetops and exposed upper slopes. This community is characterised by Allocasuarina diminuta, with scattered scribbly gum (Eucalyptus rossii) and Dwyer’s mallee gum (Eucalyptus dwyeri). There is frequently a dense shrub layer with common species being heath myrtle (Calytrix tetragona), urn heath (Melichrus lanceolatus), daphne heath (Brachyloma daphnoides) and rusty spider flower (Grevillea floribunda).

Big Bush Nature Reserve contains green mallee (Eucalyptus viridis). This mallee species has a restricted range in NSW and is poorly represented in conservation reserves. The reserves are three of only four reserves known to conserve Cootamundra wattle (Acacia baileyana) as an endemic species.

Whilst no plant species listed under the Threatened Species Act 1995 or rare or threatened Australian plants have been recorded, twelve plant species are considered regionally significant due to limited distribution (Porteners 2001).

==== Introduced flora ====
Weed infestations are concentrated in areas of previous disturbance, particularly in past grazing areas, and along current agricultural boundaries. The reserves contain limited discrete patches of weeds including Paterson’s curse (Echium plantagineum) and horehound (Marrubium vulgare). Bridal creeper (Myrsiphyllum asparagoides) occurs along roadsides adjacent to Ingalba Nature Reserve. There have also been minor occurrences of bathurst burr (Xanthium spinosum), galvanised burr (Scerolaena birchii), saffron thistle (Carthamus lanatus) and of pasture species.

=== Fauna ===
The vegetation communities of the reserves provide a range of habitats for native fauna. Seventeen animal species listed under the Threatened Species Act 1995 have been recorded on the reserves. Known resident species include the Gilbert’s whistler (Pachycephala inornata), barking owl (Ninox connivens), superb parrot (Polytelis swainsonii), turquoise parrot (Neophema pulchella) and diamond firetail (Stagonopleura guttata). A number of declining eastern woodland birds also occur, including the hooded robin (Melanodryas cucullata cucullata), grey-crowned babbler (Pomatostomus temporalis temporalis) and black-chinned honeyeater (Melithreptus gularis gularis). The painted honeyeater (Grantiella picta) is often present in spring. Autumn and winter flowering eucalypts, especially mugga ironbark, occasionally attract the endangered swift parrot (Lathamus discolor), and on rare occasions regent honeyeaters (Xanthomyza phrygia). Malleefowl (Leipoa ocellata) were once present at Ingalba and Big Bush Nature Reserves, but individuals or active breeding mounds have not been observed for over twenty years and it is considered to be locally extinct. Seven amphibians, 12 reptiles, 16 mammals (including 8 species of bats) and 164 native bird species have been recorded from the reserves (NPWS Wildlife Atlas).

The reserves are connected by narrow vegetation corridors allowing movement of some fauna species between the three areas.

==== Introduced fauna ====
Introduced animals occurring within the reserves include foxes, rabbits and cats. Feral goats and deer have been sighted occasionally in Ingalba Nature Reserve, but are not resident. The lack of permanent water sources in the reserves restricts the occupation of the reserve by feral animals.

== Human use ==
Cultural heritage includes both Aboriginal and non-Aboriginal history and associated activities and works. It comprises important sites, structures and relics that may have aesthetic, historic, scientific and social significance to present and future generations.

The geology, landform, climate and plant and animal communities of the area, plus location, have determined use by humans. Main forms of past disturbance include clearing (especially in southern portions of Ingalba and Big Bush Nature Reserves), sheep grazing, and logging for fences and firewood. Mugga ironbark, grey box and white cypress pine have been extensively logged at Ingalba Nature Reserve. Regeneration since reservation has resulted in a progressive increase in vegetation density with significant tree and shrub regrowth.

Ingalba Nature Reserve contains disturbed areas relating to its logging past, including historical rubbish piles, trails and cleared areas. Quarrying and fire have also shaped the landscape. Pucawan Nature Reserve was formerly used as a quarry site. There is a registered apiary site in Pucawan Nature Reserve.

Truck stopping areas are located adjacent to Ingalba Nature Reserve on both sides of the Temora-Griffith Road.

=== Aboriginal heritage ===
Knowledge of past use is limited. Scarred trees and open campsites are the only registered sites known in the area. Sites are likely to have been widespread throughout the reserves, but the ground has been disturbed by past land use such as logging. On lands adjoining Ingalba Nature Reserve, scattered stone artefacts have been found. The reserves lie within the area occupied by the Wiradjuri people. Today Pucawan and Ingalba Nature Reserves lie within the area of the Narrandera Local Aboriginal Land Council, while Big Bush Nature Reserve is within the area of the Young Local Aboriginal Land Council.

=== Historic sites ===
All three reserves have previously had timber cut, especially Ingalba and Big Bush Nature Reserves. Timber was removed for many purposes, such as fencing posts, firewood, charcoal for farm forges, shed poles and railway sleepers. Today regrowth from tree stumps serve as reminders of this past use. Subsidiary material, such as tins and bottles, has been left behind from logging activities and these are scattered throughout Ingalba Nature Reserve. Both Ingalba and Pucawan Nature Reserves also served as a depository for rubbish dumping by many generations of neighbouring farmers. The Casuarina Track in Ingalba Nature Reserve is part of an old horse-drawn vehicle route between Temora and Mimosa Station. A stock route runs between the two sections of Big Bush Nature Reserve along Cedar Road, formerly called Campbell’s Stock Route. Two small peaks in Ingalba Nature Reserve, Northcote and Mt Wharrun, were used for Trigonomic surveying and state surveying markers remain in these points.

Pucawan Nature Reserve was used as a rifle range in 1917, as a means to maintain rifle skills in the post-World War 1 period, and is still known locally as ‘rifle butts hill’. A target mound, and shooting mounds at set distances from the target still remain.

=== Ongoing management ===
NSW Parks and Wildlife aims to preserve, conserve and enhance the parks through ensuring that human impact is managed appropriately. Key activities include weed and pest eradication and control, fire track management, road user management and enhancement of the public knowledge of the reserves. Given the proximity of privately owned, uncleared land (often neighbouring the reserves and in the case of Ingalba and Big Bush, linking them) there is a possibility that the size of the reserve could be increased through purchase or donation of the land to the NSW Parks and Wildlife Service.

== See also ==
- Protected areas of New South Wales
