= Cyperus gymnocaulos =

Spiny flatsedge

Scientific classification
- Kingdom: Plantae
- Clade: Tracheophytes
- Clade: Angiosperms
- Clade: Monocots
- Clade: Commelinids
- Order: Poales
- Family: Cyperaceae
- Genus: Cyperus
- Species: C. gymnocaulos

Binomial name
- Cyperus gymnocaulos Steud.

Species of plant

Cyperus gymnocaulos, commonly known as spiny flatsedge, is a sedge of the family Cyperaceae that is native to Australia.

== Description ==
The rhizomatous perennial grass-like sedge typically grows to a height of 0.35 to 1 metre (1.1 to 3.3 ft) and has a tufted habit. It blooms between July and March producing brown flowers. It normally has a short thick rhizome with smooth, trigonous and terete culms. The leaves are reduced to sheaths, except for juvenile plants.

C. gymnocaulos is usually smaller and less robust than C. vaginatus.

== Taxonomy ==
The species was first formally described by the botanist Ernst Gottlieb von Steudel in 1854 as part of the work Synopsis Plantarum Glumacearum. Known synonyms include; Cyperus cruciformis and Cyperus vaginatus var. densiflorus. The name is commonly misapplied to Cyperus textilis.

== Distribution ==
It is found in swamps and along creeks and rivers and other damp areas in all the states of mainland Australia as well as the Northern Territory. In Western Australia it is found in the Mid West, Wheatbelt, South West and Goldfields-Esperance regions where it grows in sandy-clay soils.

== First Nations Uses ==
Used sometimes in net making.

== See also ==
- List of Cyperus species
