= Nest Hill Nature Reserve =

Nature reserve in New South Wales, Australia

- IUCN category Ia (strict nature reserve)
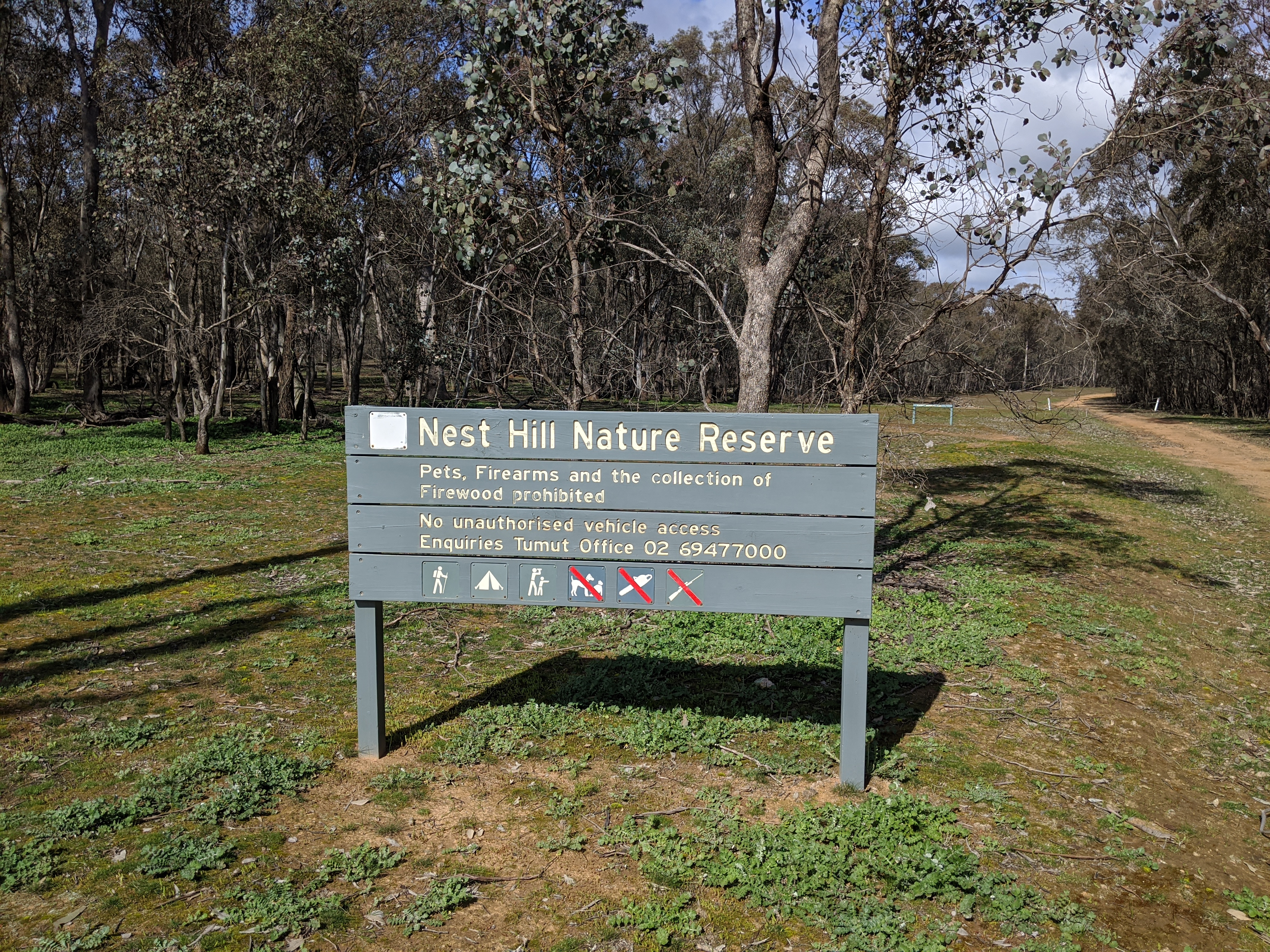
- Entrance sign, Nest Hill Nature Reserve

- Location within New South Wales
- Location: New South Wales
- Nearest city: Pulletop
- Coordinates: 35°30′26.3″S 147°21′36″E
- Area: 7.59 km^{2} (2.93 sq mi)
- Established: 1 January 2001
- Governing body: NSW National Parks & Wildlife Service
- Website: Official website

Nest Hill Nature Reserve is a protected nature reserve, located in the South Western Slopes region of New South Wales, in eastern Australia. The 759 ha (1,880-acre) reserve is located approximately 25 km (16 mi) north of Holbrook, and 35 km (22 mi) south of Wagga Wagga.

== History ==
The reserve lies within Wiradjuri country, however little is known about its historic significance to Aboriginal people. The lack of permanent water within the reserve suggests that it may have been of low importance.

The reserve was gazetted as Pulletop State Forest on 4 May 1917, and managed by the Forestry Commission of NSW for logging and timber harvesting activities. The state forest was reclassified as a nature reserve on 1 January 2001. The name Nest Hill is derived from a dominant peak of the same name located 5 km (3.1 mi) south of the reserve.

== Environment ==
Nest Hill Nature Reserve is situated on the undulating slopes of County Ridge and is relatively flat in comparison to the surrounding landscape. The reserve is generally dry for most of the year, with flowing water only usually accumulating after summer storms or during the wetter winter months.

=== Flora ===
119 plant species have been recorded within the reserve, of which 91 were native, and 28 were introduced. Large tree species present within the reserve include white box, red stringybark, red box and scribbly gum.

Native plant species recorded within the reserve include chocolate lily, twining fringe-lily, bulbine lily, early nancy, dusky fingers, common onion orchid, purple burr-daisy, grass tree, box-leaf wattle, silver wattle, woolly wattle, hairy geebung and creamy candles.

The reserve has limited native vegetation structure in the midstorey and understorey due to historic livestock grazing and ongoing grazing by kangaroos.

=== Fauna ===
Four species of reptiles, 20 species of birds, and 7 species of mammals have been recorded within the reserve. Four bird species listed under the Biodiversity Conservation Act 2016 have been recorded within the reserve, including black-chinned honeyeater, brown treecreeper, diamond firetail and speckled warbler.

Introduced pest species found within the reserve include European fox and European rabbit.

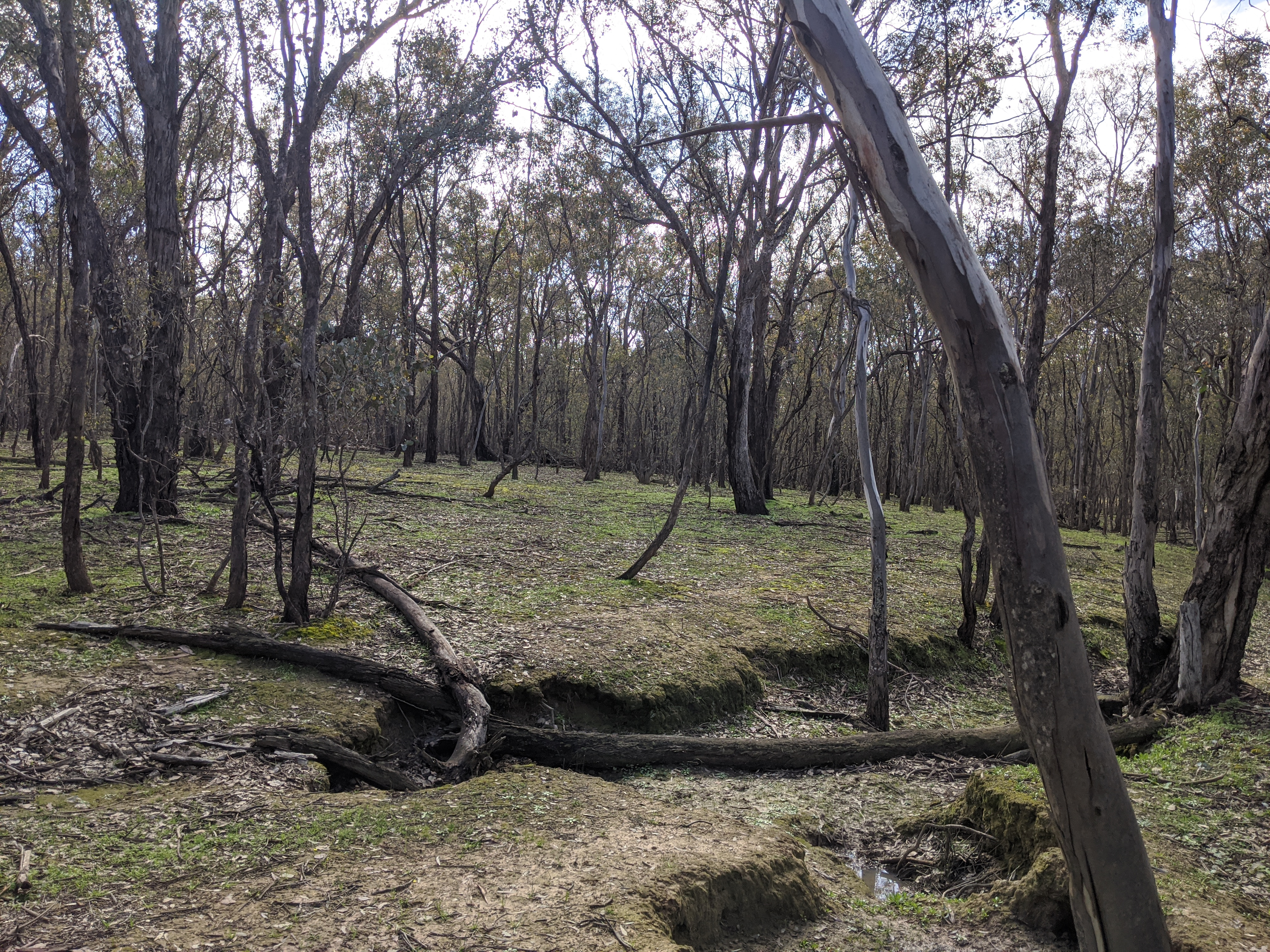
View of the forest, Nest Hill Nature Reserve, 2020

== See also ==
- Protected areas of New South Wales
