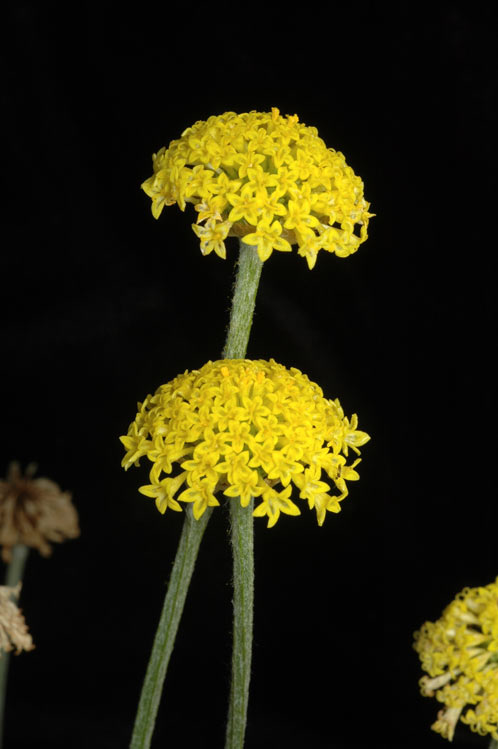

Scientific classification
- Kingdom: Plantae
- Clade: Tracheophytes
- Clade: Angiosperms
- Clade: Eudicots
- Clade: Asterids
- Order: Asterales
- Family: Asteraceae
- Genus: Ammobium
- Species: A. craspedioides

Binomial name
- Ammobium craspedioides Benth.

= Ammobium craspedioides =

Yass daisy

Species of plant

Ammobium craspedioides, commonly known as Yass daisy, is a species of perennial herb in the daisy family Asteraceae. It has slender stems, grey leaves and heads of yellow flowers and is endemic to New South Wales.

== Description ==
Ammobium craspedioides is a perennial herb mostly 30–60 cm (12–24 in) high with unbranched, more or less woolly, slender stems and single flowers. The leaves are formed in a rosette, oblong to lance-shaped, 3–12 cm (1.2–4.7 in) long, 10–17 mm (0.39–0.67 in) wide, grey, upper surface with scale-like hairs, lower surface woolly, apex pointed and the petiole 10–30 mm (0.39–1.18 in) long. The yellow flower heads about 10–20 mm (0.39–0.79 in) in diameter, hemispherical, involucres bracts about 10 mm (0.39 in) long, dry and pale yellow. Flowering occurs in summer and the fruit is an achene about 4 mm (0.16 in) long, smooth and light brown.

== Taxonomy and naming ==
Ammobium craspedioides was first formally described in 1857 by George Bentham and the description was published in Flora Australiensis. The specific epithet (craspedioides) means like the genus Craspedia.

== Distribution and habitat ==
Yass daisy grows in woodland, forests and near roadsides in the Yass district of New South Wales.
