= Ulandra Nature Reserve =

Protected area in New South Wales, Australia

- IUCN category Ia (strict nature reserve)
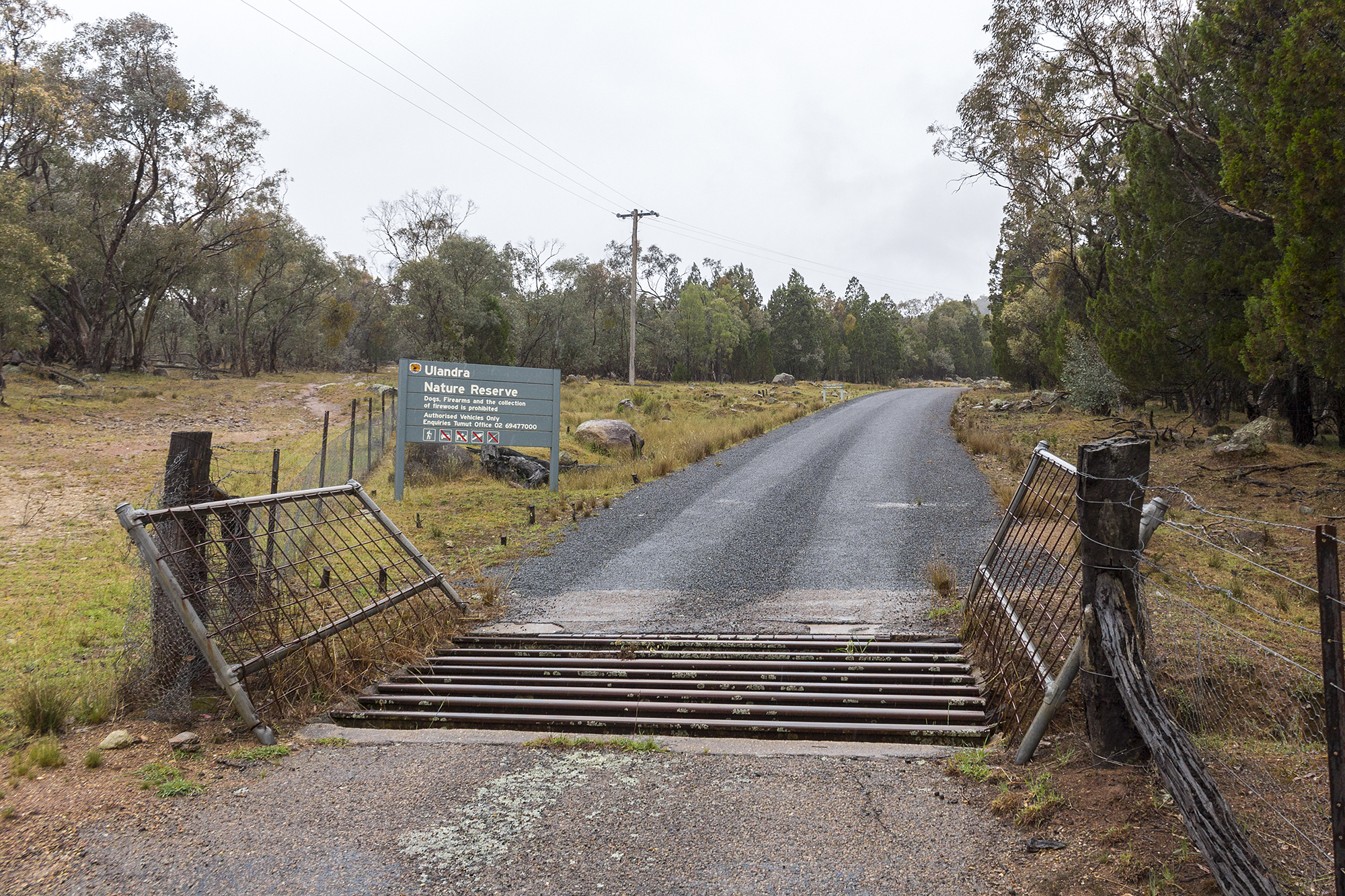
- Tower Road entrance into Ulandra Nature Reserve

- Location within New South Wales
- Location: New South Wales
- Nearest city: Cootamundra
- Coordinates: 34°48′59″S 147°55′7″E
- Area: 39.3 km^{2} (15.2 sq mi)
- Established: June 1981
- Governing body: NSW National Parks and Wildlife Service
- Website: Official website

The Ulandra Nature Reserve is a protected nature reserve in the west hills of the Southern Tablelands and eastern Riverina regions of New South Wales in eastern Australia. The 3,930-hectare (9,700-acre) reserve is situated approximately 25 kilometres (16 mi) south-west of Cootamundra and 4 kilometres (2.5 mi) south-east of the village of Bethungra.

The reserve's main feature is Mount Ulandra. Immediately west of the reserve lies an undulating plain that varies between 200 and 300 metres (660 and 980 ft) above sea level which rises abruptly at Mount Ulandra to its summit at 761 metres (2,497 ft) above sea level. The reserve was dedicated in 1981 to protect stands of Cootamundra wattle. The reserve is used for foraging and reproduction by the threatened superb parrot. It was then progressively added to until 1983.

The reserve is listed on the Register of the National Estate. Its Statement of Significance there reads as follows: 'This nature reserve constitutes a highly important remnant of regionally representative open forest in the agricultural district of the south-west slopes, dominated by Callitris endlicheri and a variety of eucalypts. These vegetation types do not survive within the region to any great extent beyond this reserve. The reserve contains the invasive ornamental Acacia baileyana growing in a portion of its relatively restricted natural distribution. The reserve also appears to furnish critical reproductive and foraging resources for the threatened superb parrot (Polytelis swainsonii) as well as significant habitat for another vulnerable bird species, the turquoise parrot (Neophema pulchella). Moreover, it represents almost a sole habitat isolate for many species which can be regarded as regionally uncommon due to the extent of clearing, and for irruptive/migratory nectarivorous and insectivorous passerines. Included within Ulandra Nature Reserve is a relatively undisturbed catchment (feeding Merrybundinah Creek); such a phenomenon is a rarity within an agriculturally transformed landscape of this type.'

== Features ==
The Ulandra Nature Reserve covers an area of wooded hills known as the Ulandra Range. The terrain is hilly with rough rocky ridges, several steep sided gullies and a catchment which feeds into Merrybundindah Creek. Most of the reserve is above 500 metres (1,600 ft) above sea level. Vegetation is mostly open forest of cypress pine and gums. Wattles are also prevalent. There are records of grey kangaroos and swamp wallabies as well as brushtail possums and ringtail possums. There are also an undetermined numbers of bats.

As at July 2015, the Atlas of NSW Wildlife recorded 114 bird species within the reserve. The bird species listed as 'vulnerable' in New South Wales, recorded in the reserve, are the little eagle, gang-gang cockatoo, turquoise parrot, brown treecreeper, speckled warbler, varied sittella, hooded robin, scarlet robin, flame robin, and diamond firetail.

The reserve contains evidence of historic Aboriginal activity. Stone artifacts and other relics have been recorded at the site. Since European settlement activities within the reserve have included clearing, grazing and minor amounts of timber getting. Evidence of this remains in fence lines, stockyards, buildings and dams.

The reserve shows signs of damage due to previous pastoral clearing and stock water dam construction, as well as continued predation and competition from introduced animals, especially pigs. Infestations of introduced weeds are also a problem. There is an inholding within the reserve on which telecommunications installations have been constructed. These structures are visible from much of the reserve.

Note that, being a nature reserve, members of the public can only enter it if they have permission to do so from the NSW National Parks and Wildlife Service.

== See also ==
- Protected areas of New South Wales
