= Weddin Mountains National Park =

National park in Australia

- IUCN category II (national park)
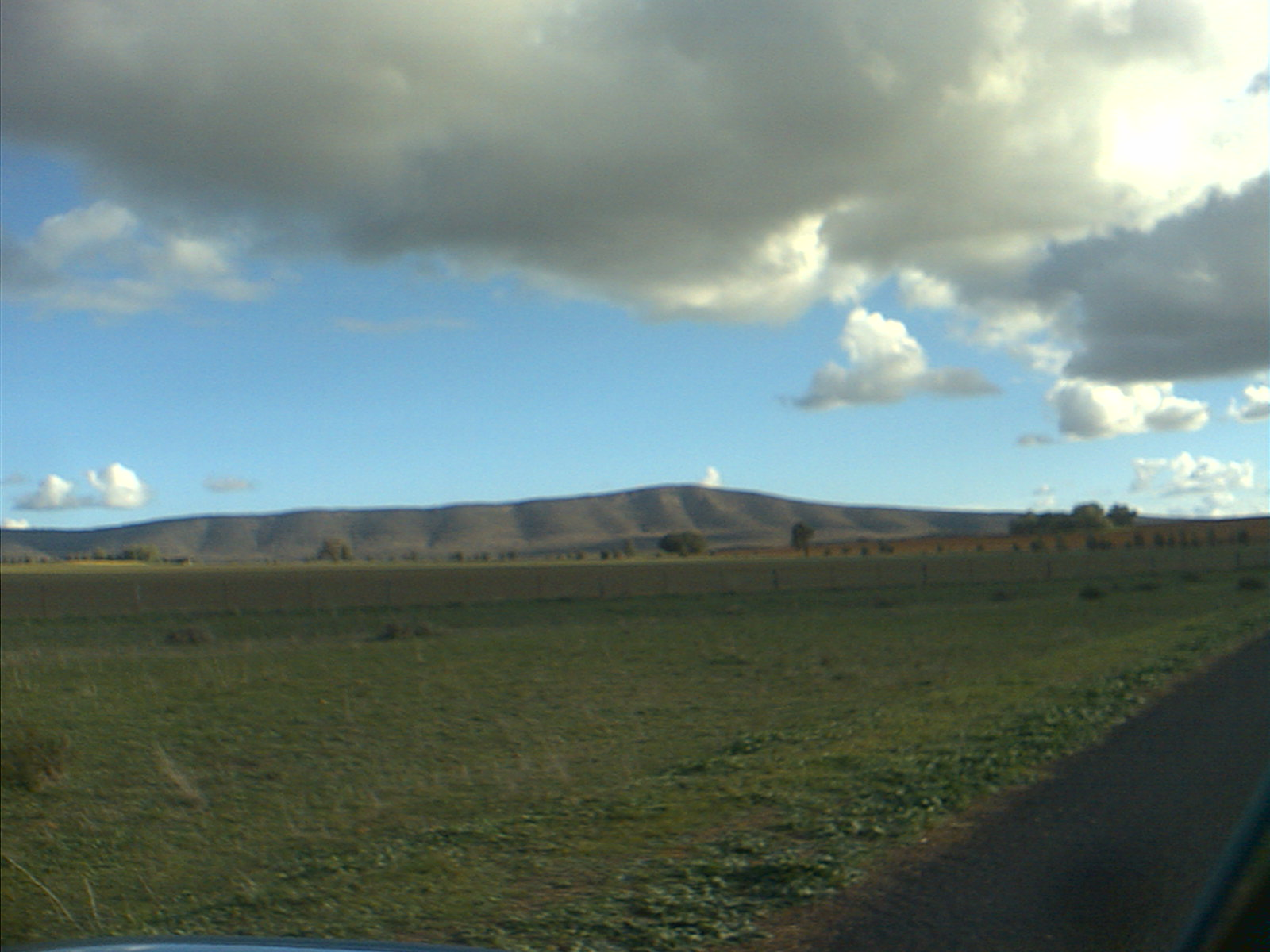
- The Weddin Mountains rise from the surrounding flat land - view looking south from the Euraldrie road

- Location within New South Wales
- Location: New South Wales
- Coordinates: 33°58′19.9″S 148°01′23.2″E
- Area: 83.61 km^{2} (32.28 sq mi)
- Established: 12 November 1971
- Governing body: National Parks and Wildlife Service (New South Wales)

Weddin Mountains is a national park located in New South Wales, Australia, 291 kilometres (181 mi) west of Sydney. It is a small, crescent-shaped range, with a high point some 750 metres (2,460 ft) AHD, running roughly north south with steep cliffs on the eastern side sloping more gradually down to the plain in the west. Weddin mountains is a small patch of remnant vegetation which escaped clearing due to its ruggedness. Many aircraft pass overhead on their way from Sydney to Adelaide, is part of the Lachlan Fold system and is Wiradjuri country.

== History ==
=== Bushrangers ===
Ben Hall, who plundered the Forbes-Grenfell area in the 1850s used the Weddin Mountains as a refuge. He holed up in a cave on the north-west side of the park with his gang, which included Johnnie Gilbert and Frank Gardiner. It is rumoured Ben Hall buried a treasure here that has not yet been located.

=== Seaton's Farm ===
There is a walk around 'Seaton's Historic Farm', which is now part of the national park. Seatons Farm is how one man and his wife turned every bit of wire into something useful. Jim Seaton hand made 3 km/1.8 miles of kangaroo proof fence by hand, with posts of local saplings, which are rot and vermin proof. The property was occupied in the late 1920s and during the Depression it was set up as a farm. Times and the land were hard and the buildings represent this. The sheds have walls made from flattened corrugated iron so that it stretched further. One of the sheds is full of old wire, iron sheets, bottles, everything you can imagine. All the old machinery is still there, sitting where it was when the family sold the property to the Government in the 1980s. A unique place, showing how the less well off farmers did it in the early and mid 1900s.

== Wildlife ==
There are 216 species of animals recorded in Weddin Mountains National Park, the vast majority of which are birds. The species list includes three types of wallaby, one of which is the endangered brush tailed rock wallaby. The species list also includes painted honeyeater, swift parrot, little lorikeet and turquoise parrot. Pest species seen in the park are cats, rabbits, foxes, goats and sheep.

The park is part of the South-west Slopes of NSW Important Bird Area (IBA), identified as such by BirdLife International because of its importance for the conservation of swift parrots and superb parrots.

== Access and facilities ==
Weddin Mountains National Park is most often approached from Grenfell. Travelling west from Grenfell on the Mid Western Highway there are sign posts to Holy Camp and Ben Halls Cave. The Google Earth route from Grenfell guides drivers along Euladrie road which ends at a farm two kilometres from the park with farmland in between.

=== Ben Halls Cave ===
Near Seaton's Farm is Ben Halls camping and picnic area with well designed fireplace/barbecues, large enough to permit the use of camp ovens, your own barbecue or for an open fire as well as having its own BBQ plate. It is a short walk from here to Ben Halls Cave.

=== Holy Camp ===
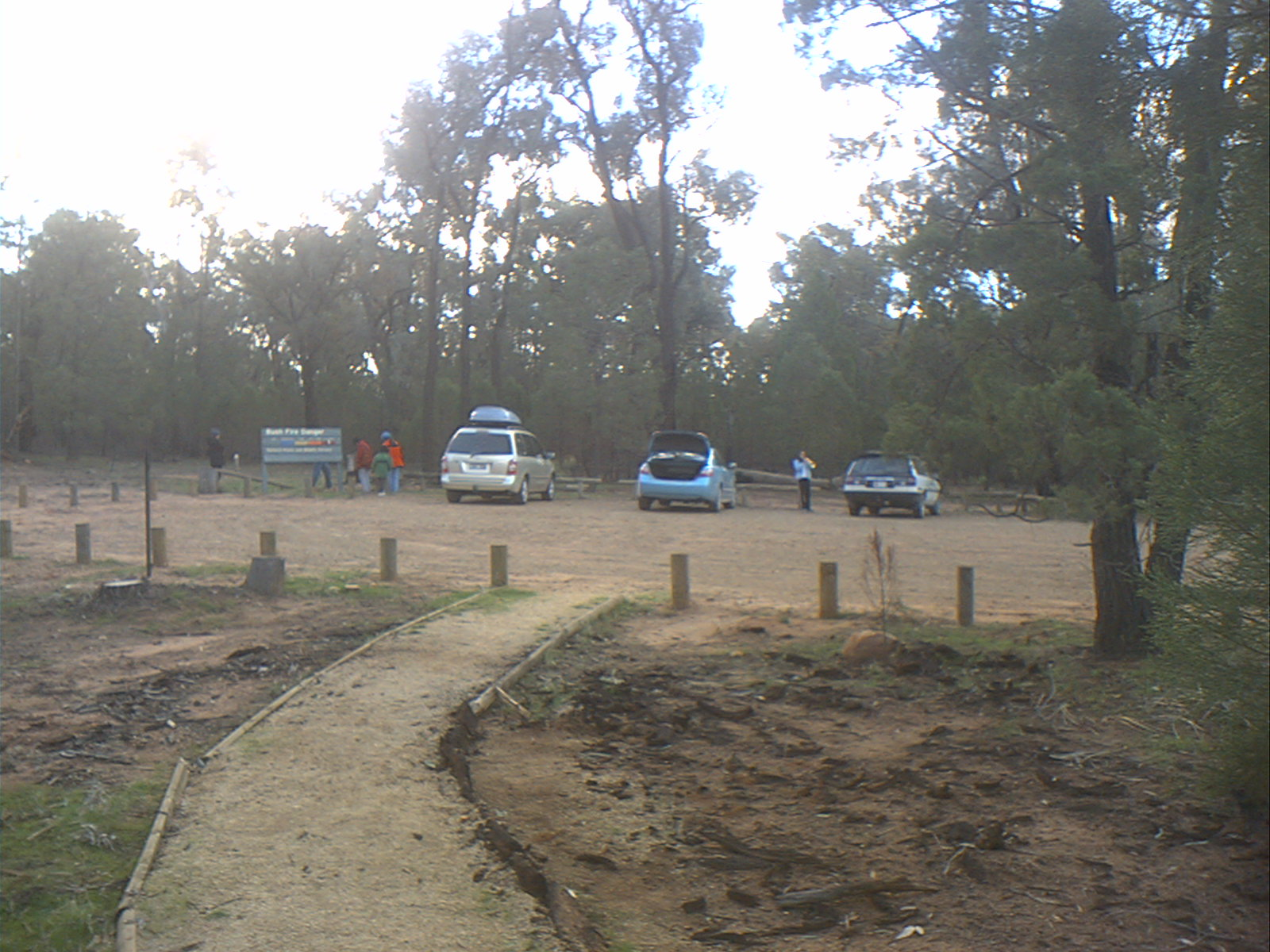
Holy Camp. Picnic and basic camping ground.

Holy Camp is 19 kilometres (12 mi) south-west of Grenfell, Coordinates 33.897857°S 148.002901°E. The last 3.8 kilometres (2.4 mi) are dirt road. It is one of the entrances to the park with a pit toilet, parking area, picnic tables and fireplaces. Camping is allowed. There is a small water tank filled from the toilet roof but don't rely on it. From here it is possible to walk to Eualdrie and Peregrine lookouts. There is much wildlife in and around the carpark including lace monitors and skinks by day and brushtail possums and owlet nightjars by night.

=== Walks ===
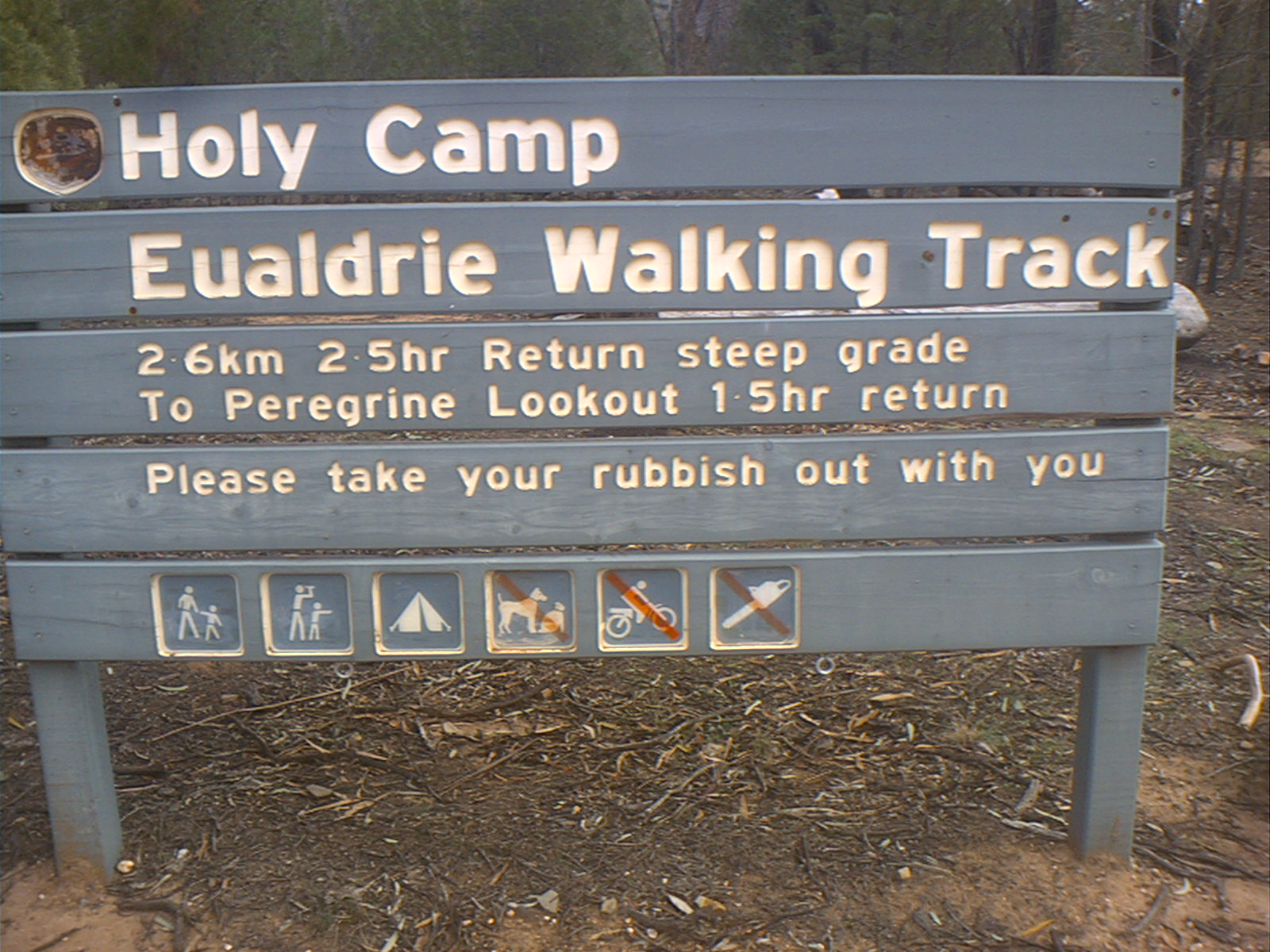
Signboard in Holy Camp advertising walk

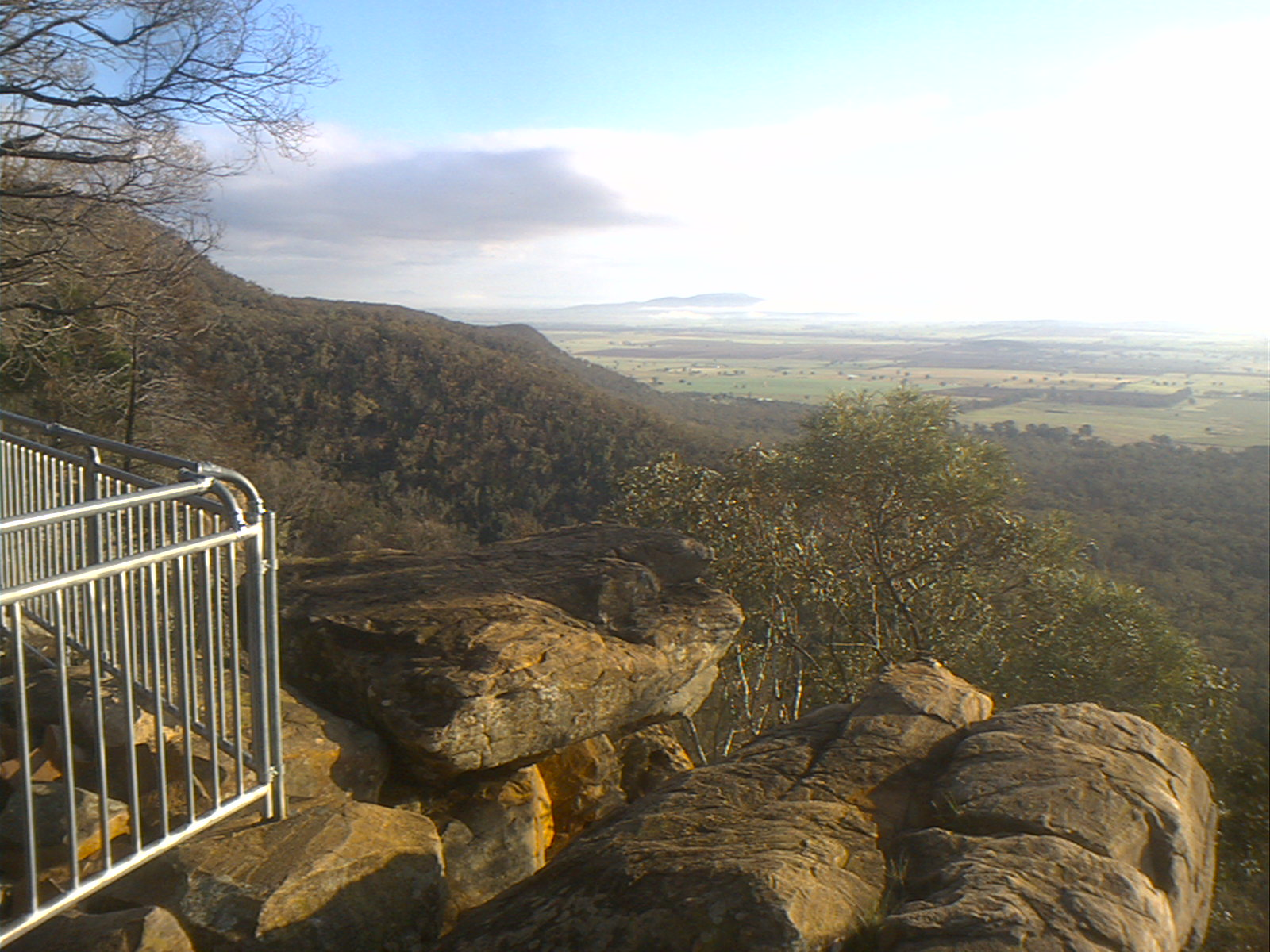
Looking northeast from Peregrine Lookout above Holy Camp.

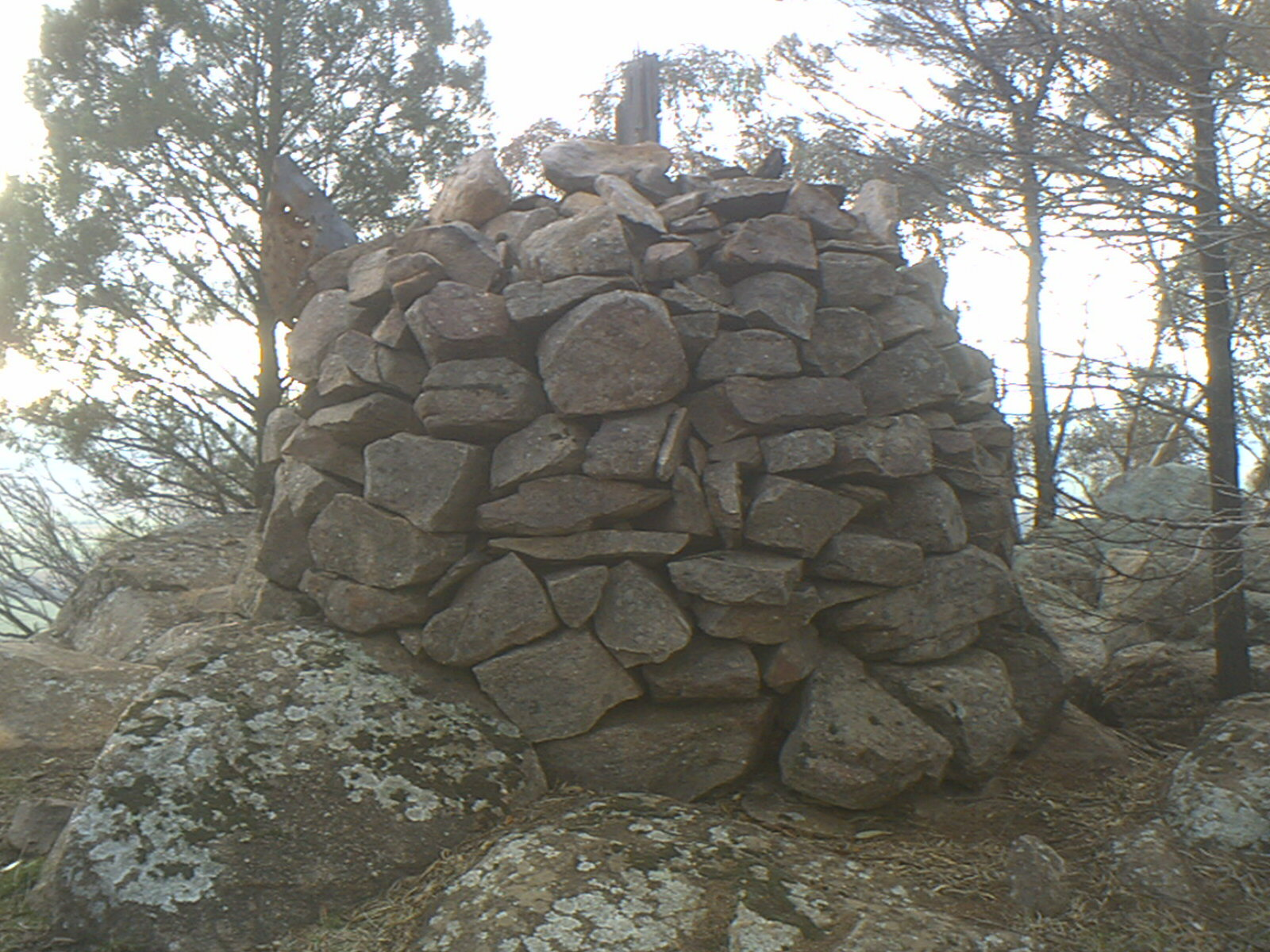
Euraldrie Trig above Holy Camp

The Eualdrie walking trail leads from Holy Camp and is advertised as a 2.6-kilometre (1.6 mi) 2.5 hour return trip passing through Peregrine Lookout which takes 1.5 hours return. This was tested as 30 minutes to Perrigrine lookout, 23 minutes more to the Cairn at the summit and 40 minutes return. Peregrine Lookout is south of the carpark and from there the path turns back on itself as it proceeds upwards so that the cairn at the summit is a little north of the carpark. The path appears to continue past the cairn at Euradrie Trig (height 750 m) and can be followed down to Ben Halls Cave.

== Literature ==
This small range is mentioned in a surprising number of publications. Two of note are A West Country Ballad which refers to a bounty hunter who unsuccessfully tried to capture Gardiner in the Weddin mountains and Robbery Under Arms where Weddin mountains gets a mention as a hideout.

== See also ==
- Protected areas of New South Wales
