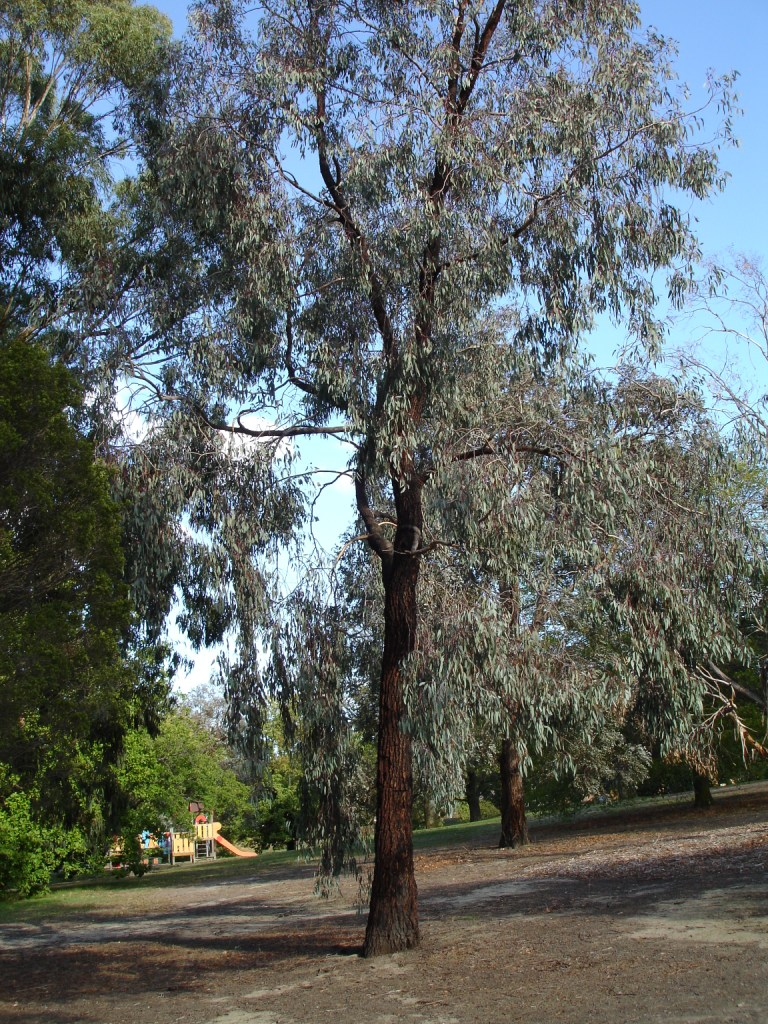

Conservation status
- Least Concern (IUCN 3.1)

Scientific classification
- Kingdom: Plantae
- Clade: Tracheophytes
- Clade: Angiosperms
- Clade: Eudicots
- Clade: Rosids
- Order: Myrtales
- Family: Myrtaceae
- Genus: Eucalyptus
- Species: E. sideroxylon

Binomial name
- Eucalyptus sideroxylon A.Cunn. ex Woolls
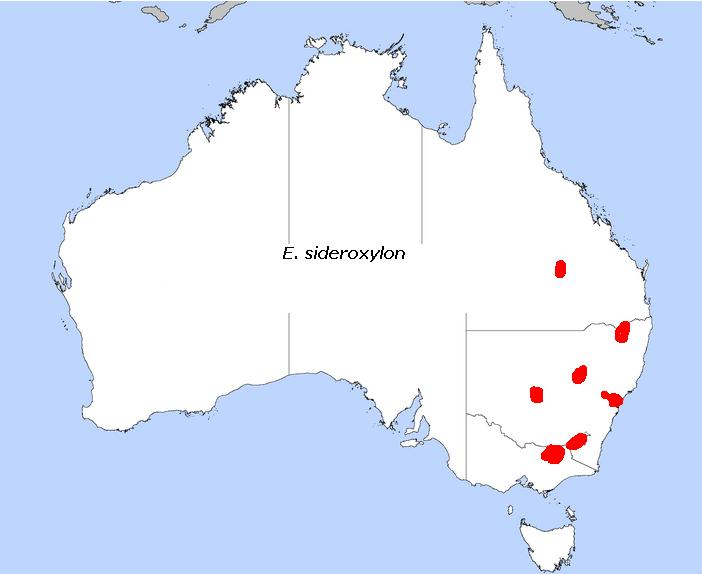
- E. sideroxylon, field distribution

= Eucalyptus sideroxylon =

Mugga ironbark, red ironbark

Species of eucalyptus

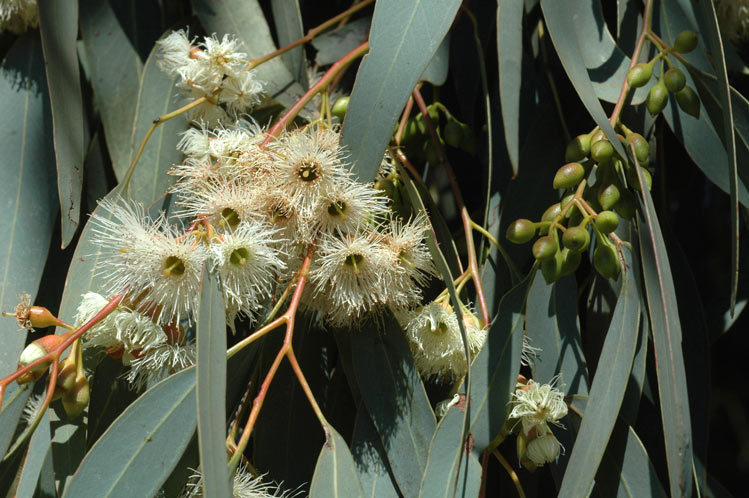
Flower buds and flowers – white form

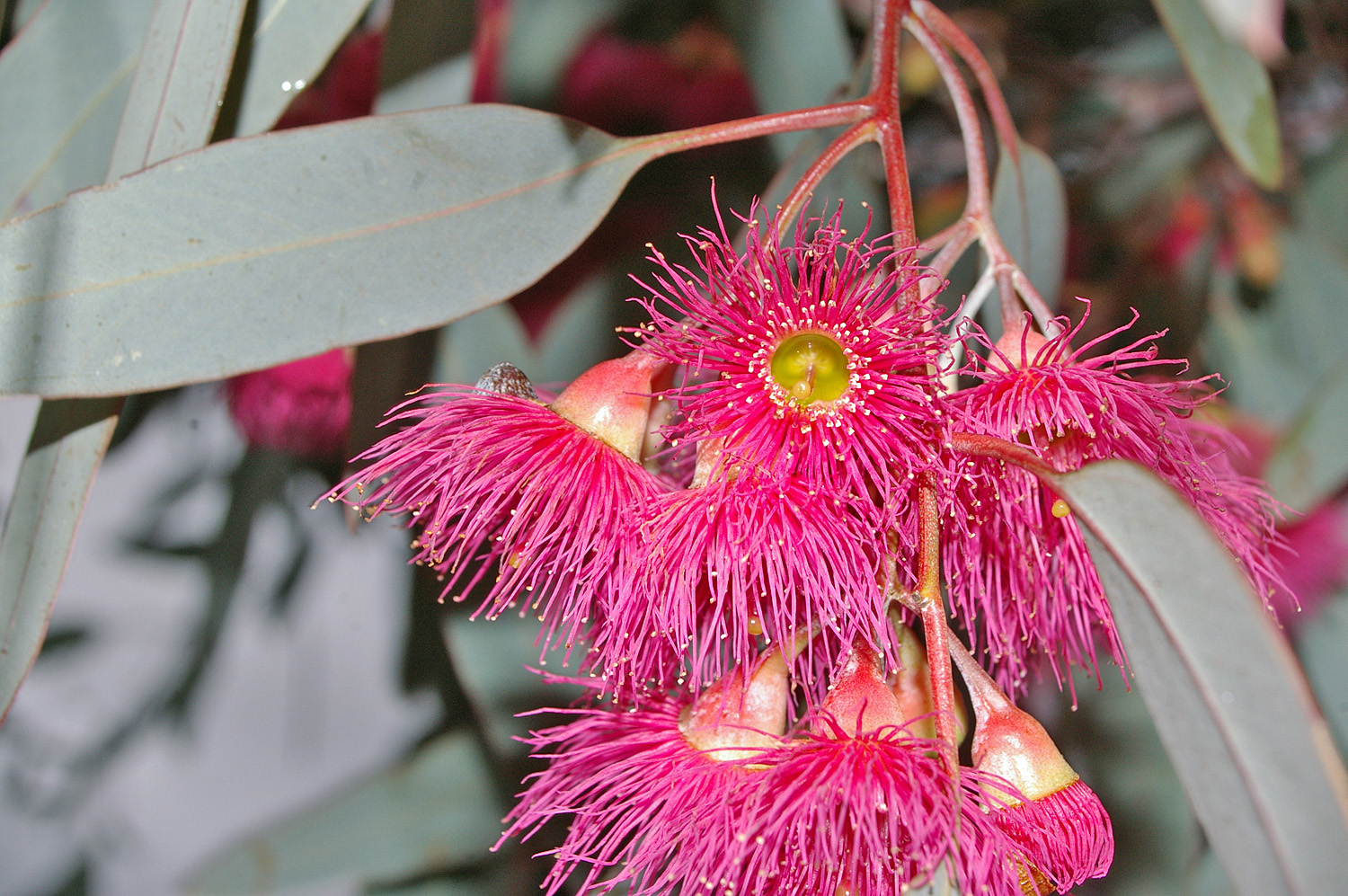
Flowers – red form

Eucalyptus sideroxylon, commonly known as mugga ironbark, or red ironbark is a small to medium-sized tree that is endemic to eastern Australia. It has dark, deeply furrowed ironbark, lance-shaped adult leaves, flower buds in groups of seven, white, red, pink or creamy yellow flowers and cup-shaped to shortened spherical fruit.

== Description ==
Eucalyptus sideroxylon is a tree that typically grows to a height of 25–35 m (82–115 ft) and forms a lignotuber. The bark is dark grey to black, deeply furrowed ironbark on the trunk and larger branches, smooth white to grey on the thinnest branches. Young plants and coppice regrowth have lance-shaped to oblong or linear leaves that are 30–110 mm (1.2–4.3 in) long and 5–35 mm (0.20–1.38 in) wide. Adult leaves are lance-shaped, the same shade of green on both sides, 50–140 mm (2.0–5.5 in) long and 10–40 mm (0.39–1.57 in) wide tapering to a petiole 5–25 mm (0.20–0.98 in) long. The flower buds are arranged in leaf axils on an unbranched peduncle 7–29 mm (0.28–1.14 in) long, the individual buds on pedicels 3–15 mm (0.12–0.59 in) long. Mature buds are oval or diamond-shaped, 6–15 mm (0.24–0.59 in) long and 4–6 mm (0.16–0.24 in) wide with a conical to beaked operculum. Flowering occurs from April to December and the flowers are white, red, pink or creamy yellow. The fruit is a woody cup-shaped to shortened spherical capsule 5–11 mm (0.20–0.43 in) long and 5–10 mm (0.20–0.39 in) wide with the valves below the level of the rim.

== Taxonomy and naming ==
Allan Cunningham recorded the name Eucalyptus sideroxylon in Thomas Mitchell's 1848 Journal of an Expedition into the Interior of Tropical Australia but did not provide a description of the plant. The first formal description of the species was published in 1887 by William Woolls in Proceedings of the Linnean Society of New South Wales. The specific epithet (sideroxylon) is derived from the ancient Greek words sidēros (σίδηρος), meaning "iron" and xylon (ξύλον), meaning "wood".

Two subspecies of E. sideroxylon are accepted by the Australian Plant Census as at December 2019:

- Eucalyptus sideroxylon subsp. improcera A.R.Bean is a small, stunted tree and has shorter, wider leaves than the autonym and longer flower buds;
- Eucalyptus sideroxylon A.Cunn. ex Woolls subsp. sideroxylon.

== Distribution and habitat ==
Mugga ironbark is widespread and often abundant in woodland from south-eastern Queensland through New South Wales to Victoria. Subspecies improcera is only known from the Barakula State Forest north-northwest of Chinchilla.

== Uses ==
The leaves are used in the production of cineole based eucalyptus oil.

Apiarists in New South Wales place hives in red-ironbark woodlands to collect the honey.

== Chemistry ==
Molecules produced by plants in case of pathogens attacks are called phytoalexins. Such compounds can be implied in the hypersensitive response of plants. High levels of polyphenols (stilbenoids and ellagitannins) in E. sideroxylon wood can explain its natural preservation against rot.

== See also ==
- List of Eucalyptus species
