= Hacker (surname) =

Hacker is a surname. Notable people with the name include:

- Alan Hacker (1938–2012), English clarinettist
- Alf Hacker (1912–1970), Australian rules footballer
- Andrew Hacker (1929–2026), American political scientist and academic
- Arthur Hacker (1858–1919), British artist
- Benedikt Hacker (1769–1829), Austrian composer and music publisher
- Benjamin Thurman Hacker (1935–2003), U.S. Naval officer
- Buddy Hackett (born Leonard Hacker, 1924–2003), American comedian and actor
- Dan Hacker (born 1982), American ice hockey center
- David Hacker (born 1964), British field hockey player
- Eric Hacker (born 1983), American baseball pitcher
- Francis Hacker (died 1660), fought for Parliament during the English Civil War
- George Hacker, American lawyer and alcohol advocate
- George Hacker (bishop) (1928–2025), Suffragan Bishop of Penrith
- Hanna Hacker (born 1956), German historian and sociologist
- Hans Hacker (1910–1994), ceramic decal designer and painter
- Hans-Joachim Hacker (born 1949), German politician
- Hilary Baumann Hacker (1913–1990), American Roman Catholic bishop
- Jack Hacker (1914–1984), Australian rules footballer
- Jacob Hacker (born 1971), American political scientist
- Jeremiah Hacker (1801–1895), American reformer and journalist
- Johnathan Hacker, American engineer
- Jörg Hacker (born 1952), German microbiologist
- Katharina Hacker (born 1967), German author
- Marcel Hacker (born 1977), German rower
- Marcus Hacker (born 1969), German specialist in nuclear medicine
- Marilyn Hacker (born 1942), American poet, critic, and reviewer
- Paul Hacker (Indologist) (1913–1979), Indologist from Germany
- Paul Hacker (diplomat) (born 1946), American diplomat
- Peter Hacker (born 1939), British philosopher
- Peter Hacker (cricketer) (born 1952), English cricketer
- Rich Hacker (1947–2020), American baseball player, base coach and scout
- Rose Hacker (1906–2008), British socialist, writer, sex educator and campaigner for social justice
- Sally Hacker (1936–1988), American feminist sociologist
- Severin Hacker (born 1984), Swiss computer scientist, co-founder and CTO of Duolingo
- Stamford Hacker (1876–1925), English cricketer
- Thomas Hacker (born 1967), German politician
- Vinnie Hacker (born 2002), American influencer
- Warren Hacker (1924–2002), American baseball pitcher

== See also ==
- Häcker (surname)
