= Lake Urana =

Lake in New South Wales, Australia

- Location within New South Wales Location within Australia
- Location: Riverina, New South Wales
- Coordinates: 35°17′S 146°11′E
- Lake type: Saline
- Primary inflows: Urangeline Creek and Coonong Creek, during flooding also Colombo Creek and Billabong Creek
- Primary outflows: Evaporation, Cocketgedong Creek
- Basin countries: Australia
- Surface area: 61.43 km^{2} (23.72 sq mi)
- Average depth: 10 to 12 metres (33 to 39 ft)
- Water volume: 0.3 km^{3} (0.072 cu mi)

Lake Urana is an ephemeral, normally endorheic lake in the Riverina region of New South Wales in eastern Australia. The lake often holds surface water in late winter and early spring, which mostly disappears via evaporation, however after sufficiently extreme rainfall events, the lake flows out through Cocketgedong Creek to Colombo Creek, and then into the Billabong Creek.

The lake lies in a depression between the large fans of the Murrumbidgee and Murray Rivers at the eastern margin of the Murray Basin, about 4 kilometres (2.5 mi) west of Urana, 40 kilometres (25 mi) east of Jerilderie, and 485 kilometres (301 mi) southwest of Sydney.

The lake has a long history of use by Aboriginal people, with skeletal remains found near the edge of the lake dating from 27-32,000 years ago, and shell middens and artifact scatters found along the lake shore.

== Description ==
Lake Urana is generally oval to kidney-shaped, with a northwest-southeast orientation. Two lunette dunes are present on the eastern side of Lake Urana, with much lower (possible shoreline) ridges further east. Construction of the outer lunette was dated by thermoluminescence to 55-35,000 years ago, and construction of the inner sandy lunette began well before 20,000 years ago and was active to 12,000 years ago. The lunettes are covered by a woodland of white cypress pine and the lake floor has large areas of river red gum woodland which is able to grow between ephemeral lakefilling events. A small isolated and irregular dunefield at the also exists at the extreme southern end of the lake. The lake's western margin consists of an irregular cliff line up to 10 m high has been cut into a low ridge of highly weathered sandstone and metasediments.

Main inflows come from Urangeline Creek, entering to the east, and Coonong Creek, entering to the north, with both streams having constructed small deltas on the lake floor. Usually the lake is endorheic, having no outflow of water to the ocean, instead emptying via evaporation, however a small overflow channel (Cocketgedong Creek) exits the lake on the western side but is only active during large-scale flood events.

In wet years floodwater from both Colombo Creek to the north and Billabong Creek to the south may flow across low catchment divides and enter the lake via Coonong Creek and Washpool Creek (a tributary of Urangeline Creek) respectively. Furthermore, the lake's usual outlet, Cocketgedong Creek, has been known to experience rare flows back into the lake.

== History ==
Lake Urana lies within Wiradjuri country, and would have been a rich source of food for Aboriginal people. The lake is likely to have supported relatively high human populations during previous wetter climatic periods, with thermoluminescence dating indicating that the period between about 30,000 and 25,000 years ago was associated with a full freshwater lake providing abundant food sources, such as marsupials, reptiles, emu eggs, mussels and fish.

Burials, grinding dishes and ovens have been found in the lunette dune on the eastern side of the lake. In late December 1988, skeletal remains of a female were discovered at a quarry in the lunette dune, which were dated to 27-32,000 years ago.

== Environment ==
=== Flora ===
Woodland found around the outskirts of the lake include tree species such as white cypress pine and yellow box, and smaller trees such as butterbush, buloke, hooked needlewood, cooba, and boree. River red gums also occur along the lake edge and across large areas of the lake floor. Shrubs which occur include thorny saltbush, ruby saltbush, western silver wattle, emu bush, and black cotton-bush.

Following floods, a number of grasses and short lived herbs such as weeping love grass, sneezeweed, sedge and yellow buttons establish on the lake bed.

=== Fauna ===
==== Birds ====
When the lake is flooded it attracts waterbirds such as Australian wood duck, Pacific black duck, grey teal, yellow-billed spoonbill, black-fronted dotterel and magpie-lark.

The northern tip of the lake falls within the Riverina Plains Important Bird Area, an area identified by BirdLife International as supporting threatened bird species such as the plains wanderer.

==== Mammals ====
Mammals known to occur at the lake include eastern grey kangaroo, common brushtail possum, and rakali.

=== Protected areas ===
Lake Urana Nature Reserve is located on the western shore of the lake, whilst the Lake Urana precinct of the South West Woodland Nature Reserve occurs on part of the lunette on the eastern shore.
