= Murrumbidgee =

Murrumbidgee is the name of a river in New South Wales, Australia. It may refer to:

- Murrumbidgee River
  - Murrumbidgee River Railway Bridge
  - Murrumbidgee Irrigation Area
  - Murrumbidgee Red Gums Important Bird Area
- Murrumbidgee Co-operative Milling, defunct flour-milling company
- Murrumbidgee Council, current government area
  - Murrumbidgee Shire, local government area
- Murrumbidgee District, historical district
- Murrumbidgee, 1977 album by The Bushwackers (band)
- Murrumbidgee electorate, a current Australian Capital Territory Legislative Assembly electorate
- Electoral district of Murrumbidgee, a former New South Wales Legislative Assembly district
