= Pharmacodiagnostic testing =

- Purpose: pre-treatment testing

Pharmacodiagnostic testing is pre-treatment testing performed in order to determine whether or not a patient is likely to respond to a given therapy. This type of test is classified as a predictive test and is a prerequisite for the implementation of stratified and personalized medicine.
