= Lake Urana Nature Reserve =

Protected area in New South Wales, Australia

- IUCN category Ia (strict nature reserve)
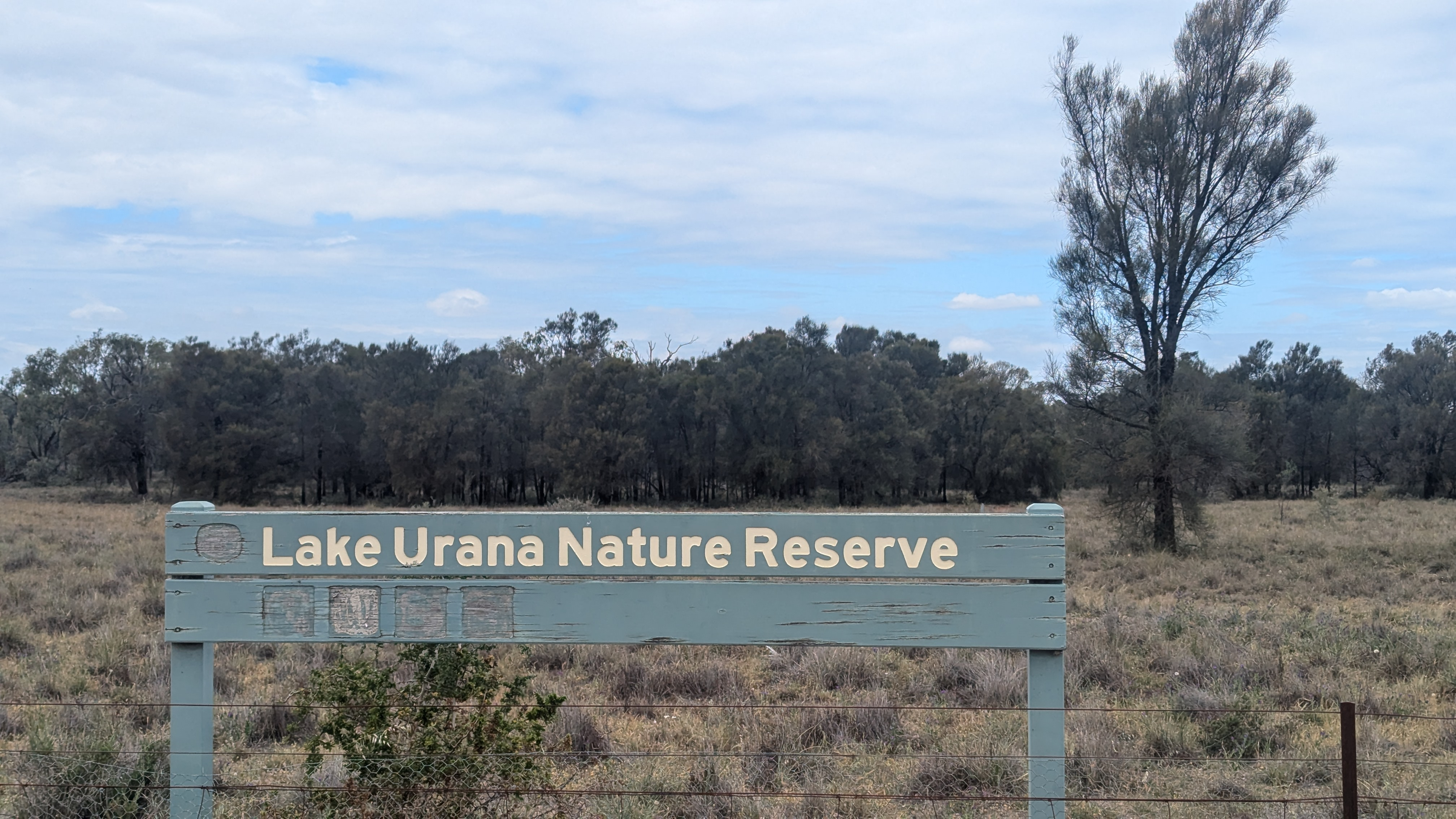

- Location within New South Wales
- Location: New South Wales
- Nearest city: Urana
- Coordinates: 35°16′30″S 146°9′11″E
- Area: 3.02 km^{2} (1.17 sq mi)
- Established: April 1996
- Governing body: NSW National Parks & Wildlife Service
- Website: Official website

The Lake Urana Nature Reserve is a protected nature reserve situated adjacent to Lake Urana, a salt lake, in the Riverina region of New South Wales in eastern Australia. The 302-hectare (750-acre) reserve is situated near the rural locality of Urana.

== Flora ==
The woodland in the reserve includes yellow box and white cypress pine. Shrubs include thorny saltbush, ruby saltbush, western golden wattle, emu bush, and black cottongrass. Ground cover is made up of grasses and herbs, with over 70 species having been recorded, including wiregrass, speargrass, and nodding chocolate lily. On the shore is a narrow area of red gum woodland.

== Fauna ==
Fauna includes eastern grey kangaroos, and 37 bird species have been identified. When the lake floods, waterbirds such as wood ducks, Pacific black duck, Australian grey teal, yellow-billed spoonbill, black-fronted dotterel, and magpie larks visit.

The northern half of the reserve falls within the Riverina Plains Important Bird Area, an area identified by BirdLife International as supporting threatened bird species such as the plains-wanderer.

== See also ==
- Protected areas of New South Wales
