= Theranostics (journal) =

- Discipline: Personalized medicine
- Language: English
- Edited by: Xiaoyuan (Shawn) Chen

Publication details
- History: 2011–present
- Publisher: Ivyspring International Publisher
- Frequency: Biweekly
- Open access: Yes
- License: CC BY-NC
- Impact factor: 11.556 (2020)

Standard abbreviations
- ISO 4: Theranostics

Indexing
- CODEN: THERDS
- ISSN: 1838-7640
- OCLC no.: 1010727598

Links
- Journal homepage; Online access

Theranostics is a biweekly peer-reviewed open access medical journal established in January 2011 and published by Ivyspring International Publisher. The editor-in-chief is Xiaoyuan Chen (National Institute of Biomedical Imaging and Bioengineering). It covers biomedical research of interest for theranostics.

== Abstracting and indexing ==
The journal is abstracted and indexed in:

- Biological Abstracts
- BIOSIS Previews
- Chemical Abstracts Service
- Embase
- Index Medicus/MEDLINE/PubMed
- Science Citation Index Expanded
- Scopus

According to the Journal Citation Reports, the journal has a 2020 impact factor of 11.556.
