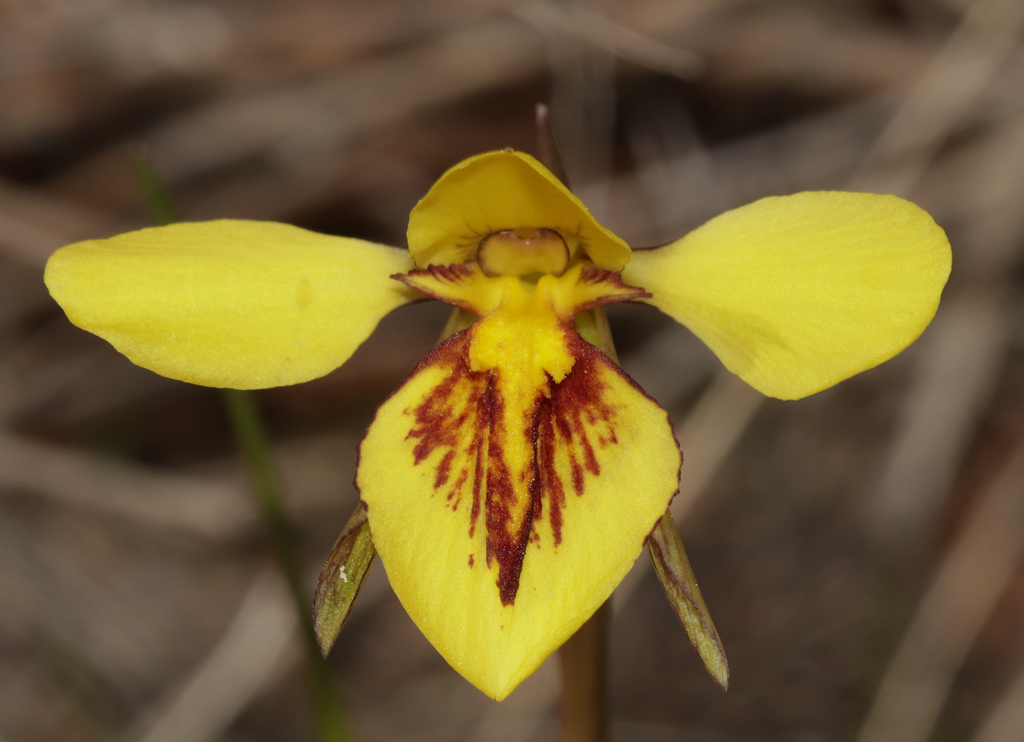

Scientific classification
- Kingdom: Plantae
- Clade: Embryophytes
- Clade: Tracheophytes
- Clade: Angiosperms
- Clade: Monocots
- Order: Asparagales
- Family: Orchidaceae
- Subfamily: Orchidoideae
- Tribe: Diurideae
- Genus: Diuris
- Species: D. fucosa

Binomial name
- Diuris fucosa D.L.Jones

= Diuris fucosa =

Species of orchid

Diuris fucosa is a species of orchid that is endemic to New South Wales. It between four and seven leaves and up to four pale yellow flowers with a few brown striations. It is only known from two sites in Callitris woodland in the south of the state and is classed as "extinct" in Victoria.

== Description ==
Diuris fucosa is a tuberous, perennial herb with a loose tussock of between four and seven narrow linear leaves 100–250 mm (4–10 in) long and 1–3.5 mm (0.04–0.1 in) wide. Up to four pale yellow flowers 30–40 mm (1–2 in) wide are borne on a flowering stem 150–300 mm (6–10 in) tall. The dorsal is egg-shaped and held close to horizontally, 11–15 mm (0.4–0.6 in) long and 7–11 mm (0.3–0.4 in) wide. The lateral sepals are green, lance-shaped with the narrower end towards the base, 15–25 mm (0.6–1 in) long, 1.5–4 mm (0.06–0.2 in) wide and turned below horizontal and usually parallel to each other. The petals spread apart from each other, elliptic to egg-shaped, 10–18 mm (0.4–0.7 in) long and 5–10 mm (0.2–0.4 in) wide on a green to brown stalk 4–7 mm (0.2–0.3 in) long. The labellum is 15–22 mm (0.6–0.9 in) long and has three lobes. The centre lobe is broadly egg-shaped, 12–17 mm (0.5–0.7 in) long and 7–14 mm (0.3–0.6 in) wide and the side lobes are oblong to wedge-shaped, 2–4 mm (0.08–0.2 in) long and 1–2 mm (0.04–0.08 in) wide with irregular edges. There are two thick, brown, pimply callus ridges near the mid-line of the labellum. Flowering occurs in August and September.

== Taxonomy and naming ==
Diuris fucosa was first formally described in 2006 by David Jones from a specimen collected near Urana and the description was published in Australian Orchid Research. The specific epithet (fucosa) is a Latin word meaning "painted", "simulated" or "counterfeit", referring to the tan-brown markings on the labellum of this orchid.

== Distribution and habitat ==
This orchid grows in Callitris woodland in two locations between Urana and Narrandera, one in a state forest and the other on private property. There are two old collections from Victoria but the species is now classed as "extinct" in that state.
