= Riverina (disambiguation) =

The Riverina is a broad region of south-central New South Wales. It may also refer to:

== Places ==
- Riverina wine region, with a legal definition smaller than the common use of the term "Riverina"
- Division of Riverina, electoral district for the parliament of Australia
- Riverina Plains Important Bird Area, grassland near the Murrumbidgee River
- Riverina Highway, in Riverina, NSW, AUS
- Anglican Diocese of Riverina

== Other uses ==
- Riverina Football Netball League, a competition for Australian Rules football and netball
- Riverina Anglican College, a co-ed secondary day school
- Riverina Institute, a training institute

== See also ==
- Division of Riverina-Darling, a former electoral district of Australia
- Riverina Movement, a separatist movement in Riverina to secede into a new state from NSW
