= The Urana Independent and Clear Hills Standard =

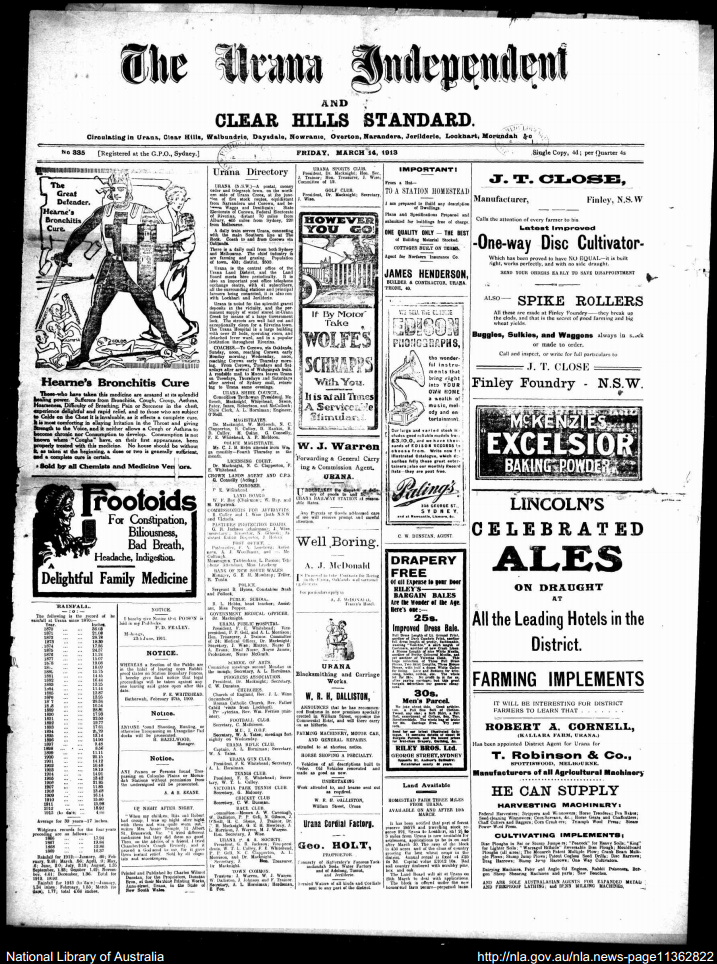
Front page of Urana Independent and Clear Hills Standard on 14 March 1913

The Urana Independent and Clear Hills Standard was a weekly newspaper published in Urana, New South Wales, Australia from 1906 until 1921. It was generally published on Friday.

== History ==
The Urana Independent was first published by Henry Dunstan. In 1906 the residents of Urana offered £100 to anyone who started a newspaper in the town. Dunstan was the first to do so and began to publish The Urana Independent in August. Dunstan had already founded the Minyip Guardian and Sheep Hills Advocate and the Yackandandah Times. Arthur Clague Cowin had planned to publish a Urana newspaper but arrived in the town a day too late. The Urana Independent ceased publication in 1921. The Clear Hills Standard was published separately on Saturdays. This Saturday edition was also sometimes known as The Clear Hills Standard and Daysdale and Saverneke Times.

== Digitisation ==
The paper has been digitised as part of the Australian Newspapers Digitisation Program project of the National Library of Australia.

== See also ==
- List of newspapers in Australia
- List of newspapers in New South Wales
