= Marcus Hacker =

Professor of Nuclear medicine (born 1969)

Marcus Hacker (born 19 October 1969 in Eggenfelden, Germany) is a university professor and specialist in nuclear medicine at the Medical University of Vienna (Vienna, Austria).

== Career ==
After completing the medicine studies at the University of Erlangen–Nuremberg and LMU Munich from 1989 to 1998 and completing his dissertation in 2002, Marcus Hacker was recognized as a specialist in nuclear medicine in 2004. From 2007, he worked as a senior physician for cardiovascular imaging and deputy head of PET/CT at LMU Klinikum, where he qualified as a professor in 2008 and was promoted to senior physician and deputy director in 2009. In 2012, Marcus Hacker was appointed as an adjunct professor at LMU Munich. Since 2013, he has been a university professor for nuclear medicine and head of the Clinical Department of Nuclear Medicine at the Medical University of Vienna.

== Scientific Achievements ==
Marcus Hacker is involved in the establishment of new individualized diagnostic and treatment procedures in nuclear medicine, particularly in cardiovascular, oncological and neuropsychiatric applications. The focus here is on in-vivo tissue characterization and the selection of suitable radiopharmaceuticals for patient-related individual risk assessment. In translational research, Marcus Hacker established new biomarkers for the identification of mechanistic relationships and for translation from cell or animal models to humans.

As for October 2024, Marcus Hacker is author of 504 original scientific papers with 14,106 citations (excluding self-citations), and 28 book chapters. The key areas of his academic interest are theranostics, PET and SPECT Hybrid Imaging, and Network- and Prevention Medicine.

== Academic Awards ==
- 2006 Dagmar-Eißner Prize for Nuclear Medicine: Award-winning work: “Multislice Spiral CT Angiography in the non-invasive detection of functionally relevant coronary artery lesions: a comparison with Myocardial SPECT";
- 2007 Wolfgang Becker Prize for Nuclear Medicine: Award-winning work: “64-Slice Spiral CT Angiography does not predict the functional relevance of coronary artery stenoses in patients with stable angina”;
- 2008 Young Investigator Award in the course of the 3rd International Symposium “Integrated Biomarkers in Cardiovascular Diseases”, Seattle, Washington (USA), Bell Harbor Conference Center, July 9 – 11, 2008. Awarded study: "Increased Arterial Wall 18FFDG-Uptake Identifies Patients at Risk for Future Cardiovascular Events: a PET-CT Study Considering Age and Cardiovascular Risk Factors";
- 2009 Young Investigator Award of the Cardiovascular Council of the Society of Nuclear Medicine in the course of the SNM Annual Meeting 2009, Toronto, Canada, June 13–17, 2009;
- 2010 EANM Young Investigator Award Winner 2010 Dr. Christopher Übleis. Awarded work: “Prediction of functional recovery after resynchronisation in patients with coronary artery disease and left ventricular dysfunction using combined 64-CTA / gated 18F-FDG-PET”;
- 2010 2nd place Young Investigator Award Clinical Science by the Cardiovascular Councils of the Society of Nuclear Medicine in course of the SNM Annual Meeting 2010 in Salt Lake City, USA, June 5–9, 2010.Awarded work: "Electrocardiogram-gated 18F-FDG PET/CT hybrid imaging in patients with unsatisfactory response to cardiac resynchronization therapy: initial clinical results";
- 2010 Wolfgang-Becker-Award 2010 for Nuclear Medicine;
- 2011 Wolfgang-Becker-Award 2011 for Nuclear Medicine. Awarded work: "68Ga-DOTATATE PET/CT for the early prediction of response to somatostatin receptor-mediated radionuclide therapy in patients with well-differentiated neuroendocrine tumors";
- 2012 Förderpreis der Berlin-Brandenburgischen Gesellschaft für Nuklearmedizin (BBGN). Awarded Work: "Relationship between PSA kinetics and [18F]fluorocholine PET/CT detection rates of recurrence in patients with prostate cancer after total prostatectomy".

== Memberships ==
- 2022 - 2024 Speaker Medical Imaging Cluster, Medical University of Vienna, Austria;
- 2017 - 2018 Chair of the Nuclear Cardiology Working Group (AG20) of the German Cardiac Society;
- 2016 - 2018 Secretary and member of the executive board and chairman of the Cardiovascular Nuclear Medicine Working Group of the German Society for Nuclear Medicine;
- 2018 Treasurer and Member of the Board of the Austrian Platform for Personalized Medicine;
- 2016 President of the Austrian Society of Nuclear Medicine and Molecular Imaging;
- 2014 - 2017 Chair of the Cardiovascular Committee of the European Association of Nuclear Medicine (Vienna, Austria);
- 2014 Member of the Scientific Committee at the Germany Multiple CME Sessions at the Annual Congresses of the European Association of Nuclear Medicine (Hannover, Germany);
- 2013 Head of the Research Group for Cardiovascular Nuclear Medicine of the German Society of Nuclear Medicine;
- 2013 Member of the Board of Directors of the Austrian Society of Nuclear Medicine and Molecular Imaging;
- 2013 Sub-Chair of the Cardiovascular Committee at the Annual Congress of the Society of Nuclear Medicine in Vancouver, Canada;
- 2013 Voted Member of the Board of Directors of the German Society of Nuclear Medicine;
- 2012 Member of the European Council of Nuclear Cardiology;
- 2012 Member of the Cardiovascular Committee of the European Association of Nuclear Medicine;
- 2010 Member of the Scientific Committee at the Annual Congresses of the German Society of Nuclear Medicine Medicine and the Society of Nuclear Medicine;
- 2010 Member of the Research Group for Nuclear Cardiological Diagnostics of the German Society of Cardiology;
- 2010 Member of the Research Group for Cardiovascular Nuclear Medicine of the German Society of Nuclear Medicine.
