= Jack Hacker =

Australian rules footballer (1914–1984)

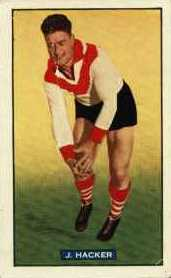

Personal information
- Full name: Jack R. Hacker
- Born: 19 April 1914; Urana, New South Wales
- Died: 17 September 1984 (aged 70)
- Original team: Oaklands
- Height: 173 cm (5 ft 8 in)
- Weight: 86 kg (190 lb)

Playing career^{1}
Years	Club	Games (Goals)
1937–1944	South Melbourne	111 (7)
- ^{1} Playing statistics correct to the end of 1944.

Jack Hacker (19 April 1914 – 17 September 1984) was an Australian rules footballer who played with South Melbourne in the Victorian Football League (VFL).

Born in Urana, New South Wales, Hacker was a defender who could play in the ruck was recruited from Oaklands in New South Wales.

Hacker made his senior VFL debut for South Melbourne in 1937 and won South Melbourne's "most improved player" award in 1938, going on to play 111 league games for the club. This included two finals in 1942, a semi final win over Footscray and preliminary final loss to Essendon. A knee injury kept him on the sidelines in 1945 and he also wasn't able to play senior football the following year.

While at South Melbourne, Hacker's rendition of Popeye was considered "as good as the original".

His brother, Alf Hacker, played for fellow VFL club North Melbourne.

== Coaching ==
Hacker was appointed playing coach of Hampden Football League club Camperdown in 1947 and led the team to the grand final, which they lost to Warrnambool.

He was captain-coach of Camperdown again in 1948, when they narrowly missed out on making another grand final, with a seven-point loss to South Warrnambool in the preliminary final.

In 1949 he coached Shepparton to a premiership in the Central Goulburn Valley Football League.
