= Hackerman =

Hackerman is a surname. Notable people with the surname include:

- Norman Hackerman (1912–2007), American chemist, professor, and academic administrator
  - Norman Hackerman Award in Chemical Research
  - Norman Hackerman Young Author Award
- Willard Hackerman (1918–2014), American businessman

== See also ==
- Hackerman Ridge, Mount Riddolls, Antarctica
- Hackerman, a fictional character in the 2015 film Kung Fury
- Hans Häckermann, German actor
- Hacker (surname)
