= Predictive medicine =

Field of medicine concerning the prediction of future diseases of a patient

Predictive medicine is a field of medicine that entails predicting the probability of disease and instituting preventive measures in order to either prevent the disease altogether or significantly decrease its impact upon the patient (such as by preventing mortality or limiting morbidity).

While different prediction methodologies exist, such as genomics, proteomics, and cytomics, the most fundamental way to predict future disease is based on genetics. Although proteomics and cytomics allow for the early detection of disease, much of the time those detect biological markers that exist because a disease process has already started. However, comprehensive genetic testing (such as through the use of DNA arrays or full genome sequencing) allows for the estimation of disease risk years to decades before any disease even exists, or even whether a healthy fetus is at higher risk for developing a disease in adolescence or adulthood. Individuals who are more susceptible to disease in the future can be offered lifestyle advice or medication with the aim of preventing the predicted illness.

Current genetic testing guidelines supported by the health care professionals discourage purely predictive genetic testing of minors until they are competent to understand the relevancy of genetic screening so as to allow them to participate in the decision about whether or not it is appropriate for them. Genetic screening of newborns and children in the field of predictive medicine is deemed appropriate if there is a compelling clinical reason to do so, such as the availability of prevention or treatment as a child that would prevent future disease.

== The goal ==
The goal of predictive medicine is to predict the probability of future disease so that health care professionals and the patient themselves can be proactive in instituting lifestyle modifications and increased physician surveillance, such as bi-annual full body skin exams by a dermatologist or internist if their patient is found to have an increased risk of melanoma, an EKG and cardiology examination by a cardiologist if a patient is found to be at increased risk for a cardiac arrhythmia or alternating MRIs or mammograms every six months if a patient is found to be at increased risk for breast cancer. Predictive medicine is intended for both healthy individuals ("predictive health") and for those with diseases ("predictive medicine"), its purpose being to predict susceptibility to a particular disease and to predict progression and treatment response for a given disease.

A number of association studies have been published in scientific literature that show associations between specific genetic variants in a person's genetic code and a specific disease. Association and correlation studies have found that a female individual with a mutation in the BRCA1 gene has a 65% cumulative risk of breast cancer. Additionally, new tests from Genetic Technologies LTD and Phenogen Sciences Inc. comparing non-coding DNA to a woman's lifetime exposure to estrogen can now determine a woman's probability of developing estrogen positive breast cancer also known as sporadic breast cancer (the most prevalent form of breast cancer). Genetic variants in the Factor V gene is associated with an increased tendency to form blood clots, such as deep vein thrombosis (DVTs). Genetics tests are expected to reach the market more quickly than new medicines. Myriad Genetics is already generating revenue from genetic tests for BRCA1 and BRCA2.

Aside from genetic testing, predictive medicine utilizes a wide variety of tools to predict health and disease, including assessments of exercise, nutrition, spirituality, quality of life, and so on. This integrative approach was adopted when Emory University and Georgia Institute of Technology partnered to launch the Predictive Health Institute. Predictive medicine changes the paradigm of medicine from being reactive to being proactive and has the potential to significantly extend the duration of health and to decrease the incidence, prevalence and cost of diseases.

== Types ==
Notable types of predictive medicine through health care professionals include:

- Carrier testing: Carrier testing is done to identify people who carry one copy of a gene mutation that, when present in both copies, causes a genetic disorder. This type of testing is offered to individuals who have genetic disorder in their family history or to people in ethnic groups with increased risk of certain genetic diseases. If both parents are tested, carrier testing can provide information about a couple's risk of having a child with a genetic disorder.
- Diagnostic testing: Diagnostic testing is conducted to aid in the specificity diagnosis or detection of a disease. It is often used to confirm a particular diagnosis when a certain condition is suspected based on the subject's mutations and physical symptoms. The diversity in diagnostic testing ranges from common consulting room tests such as measuring blood pressure and urine tests to more invasive protocols such as biopsies.
- Newborn screening: Newborn screening is conducted just after birth to identify genetic disorders that can be treated early in life. This testing of infants for certain disorders is one of the most widespread uses of genetic screening - all US states currently test infants for phenylketonuria and congenital hypothyroidism. US state law mandates collecting a sample by pricking the heel of a newborn baby to obtain enough blood to fill a few circles on filter paper labeled with names of infant, parent, hospital, and primary physician.
- Prenatal testing: Prenatal testing is used to look for diseases and conditions in a fetus or embryo before it is born. This type of testing is offered for couples who have an increased risk of having a baby with a genetic or chromosomal disorder. Screening can determine the sex of the fetus. Prenatal testing can help a couple decide whether to abort the pregnancy. Like diagnostic testing, prenatal testing can be noninvasive or invasive. Non-invasive techniques include examinations of the woman's womb through ultrasonography or maternal serum screens. These non-invasive techniques can evaluate risk of a condition, but cannot determine with certainty if the fetus has a condition. More invasive prenatal methods are slightly more risky for the fetus and involve needles or probes being inserted into the placenta or chorionic villus sampling.

== Health benefits ==
The future of medicine's focus may potentially shift from treating existing diseases, typically late in their progression, to preventing disease before it sets in. Predictive health and predictive medicine is based on probabilities: while it evaluates susceptibility to diseases, it is not able to predict with 100% certainty that a specific disease will occur. Unlike many preventive interventions that are directed at groups (e.g., immunization programs), predictive medicine is conducted on an individualized basis. For example, glaucoma is a monogenic disease whose early detection can allow to prevent permanent loss of vision. Predictive medicine is expected to be most effective when applied to polygenic multifactorial disease that are prevalent in industrialized countries, such as diabetes mellitus, hypertension, and myocardial infarction. With careful usage, predictive medicine methods such as genetic screens can help diagnose inherited genetic disease caused by problems with a single gene (such as cystic fibrosis) and help early treatment. Some forms of cancer and heart disease are inherited as single-gene diseases and some people in these high-risk families may also benefit from access to genetic tests. As more and more genes associated with increased susceptibility to certain diseases are reported, predictive medicine becomes more useful.

=== Direct-to-consumer genetic testing ===
Direct-to-Consumer (DTC) genetic testing enables a consumer to screen his or her own genes without having to go through a health care professional. They can be ordered without the permission of a physician. Variety in DTC tests range from those testing for mutations associated with cystic fibrosis to breast cancer alleles. DTC tests make the applicability of predictive medicine very real and accessible to consumers. Benefits of DTC testing include this accessibility, privacy of genetic information, and promotion of proactive health care. Risks of obtaining DTC testing are the lack of governmental regulation and the interpreting of genetic information without professional counseling.

== Limitations of predictive medicine ==
On a protein level, structure is less conserved than sequence. Therefore, in many diseases, having the faulty gene still does not necessarily mean someone will get the disease. Common, complex diseases in the wider population are affected not only by heredity, but also by external causes such as lifestyle and environment. Therefore, genes are not perfect predictors of future health; individuals with both the high risk form of the gene and those without are all candidates to get the disease. Multiple factors in the environment, particular smoking, diet and exercise, infection, and pollution; play important roles and can be more important than genetic make-up. This makes the results and risks determined by predictive medicine more difficult to quantify. Furthermore, the potential false positives or false negatives that may arise from a predictive genetic screen can cause substantial unnecessary strain on the individual.

Targeting medication to people who are genetically susceptible to a disease but do not yet show the symptoms of it can be a questionable measure. In large populations, there is concern that likely most of the people taking preventative medications would never have developed the disease anyway. Many medications carry undesirable side effects that high risk individuals must then cope with. In contrast, several populations-based prevention measures (such as encouraging healthy diets or banning tobacco advertising) carry a far lower likelihood of adverse effects and are also less expensive.

Another potential downfall of commercially available genetic testing lies within the psychological impacts of accessibility to such data. For single-gene inherited diseases, counseling and the right to refuse a test (the right "not to know") have been found to be important. However, adequate individual counseling can be difficult to employ to the potentially large proportion of the population likely to be identified as at high risk of common complex disease. Some people are vulnerable to adverse psychological reactions to genetic predictions of stigmatized or feared conditions, such as cancer or mental illness.

== Ethics and law ==
Predictive medicine ushers in a number of sensitive legal and ethical issues. There is a delicate balance that presides over predictive medicine and occupational health: if an employee were dismissed because he was found to be at risk of a certain chemical agent used in his workplace, would his termination be considered discrimination or an act of prevention? Several organizations believe that legislation is needed to prevent insurers and employers from using predictive genetic test results to decide who gets insurance or a job: "Ethical considerations, and legal, are fundamental to the whole issue of genetic testing. The consequences for individuals with regard to insurance and employment are also of the greatest importance, together with the implications for stigma and discrimination." In the future, people may be required to reveal genetic predictions about their health to their employers or insurers. The grim prospect of discrimination based on a person's genetic make-up can lead to a "genetic underclass" which does not receive equal opportunity for insurance and employment.

Currently in the United States, health insurers do not require applicants for coverage to undergo genetic testing. Genetic information is under the same protection of confidentiality as other sensitive health information under the Health Insurance Portability and Accountability Act (HIPAA) when health insurers come across it.

== See also ==
- Newborn screening – Practice of testing infants for diseases
- Whole genome sequencing – Sequencing all the DNA of an individual at once
- Personalized medicine – Medical model that tailors medical practices to the individual patient
- Molecular imaging – Imaging molecules within living patients
- Theranostics – Combination of cancer diagnosis and treatment
- Technological singularity – Hypothetical event
