= Coalition for the Prevention of Alcohol Problems =

The Coalition for the Prevention of Alcohol Problems is a Washington D.C.–based coalition of 24 public health and consumer groups co-chaired by George Hacker of the Alcohol Policies Project at the Center for Science in the Public Interest and Stacia Murphy of the National Council on Alcoholism and Drug Dependence.

Members include the Woman's Christian Temperance Union, The Church of Jesus Christ of Latter-day Saints (LDS Church), the American Council on Alcohol Problems, the Temperance League of Kentucky, the General Board of Global Ministries and the Illinois Church Action on Alcohol and Addiction Problems, among others. Over 120 organizations now participate in the Coalition for the Prevention of Alcohol Problems.

== Agenda ==
The group advocates raising taxes on beer, wine, and liquor, limiting alcohol advertising on television and radio, and opposes alcohol advertising that may target youths.

There are several issues which the Coalition has identified as priorities. These include:

1. Restrictions on alcohol advertising, including:
  - Placement of rotating health and safety messages in all alcohol advertisements.
  - Equal time for health and safety messages in the broadcast medium.
  - Elimination of ads that promote the association of drinking and risky activities.
  - Reform of alcohol ads that associate drinking with sexual and social success.
  - Restrictions on the promotional activities of alcohol companies on college campuses.
  - Restrictions on alcohol advertisements that target youth. This would include: restrictions on sponsorship of youth-oriented events such as rock concerts and sporting events; and an alcohol-free viewing period in the broadcast viewing and listening media.
  - Disallowance of tax deductions for alcohol advertising.
2. Improvements in alcoholic beverage labeling, including strengthening and expanding the current mandated warning label and providing additional consumer on alcoholic beverage containers, such as ingredients, alcohol content, calories, information about standard units of service, and a toll-free telephone number for consumer questions about alcohol.
3. Increase in federal alcohol excise taxes and equalization of the tax rate on all beverage alcohol types.
4. Stronger regulation of alcoholic beverage industry practices by federal agencies, including the Bureau of Alcohol, Tobacco and Firearms and the Federal Trade Commission.
5. Expanded research on alcohol advertising, labeling and tax issues through the National Institute on Alcohol Abuse and Alcoholism, Centers for Disease Control and Prevention, and other public and private agencies.
6. Promotion within the legislative and executive branches of government of a better understanding of alcohol as America's costliest and most widespread drug problem.
7. Stronger demand-reduction policies related to alcohol, and proposals to expand public alcoholism treatment and prevention initiatives.
