= European Association of Nuclear Medicine =

- Abbreviation: EANM
- Formation: September 6, 1985; 41 years ago
- Type: Non-profit organisation, scientific society
- Headquarters: Vienna, Austria
- Official language: English
- Website: eanm.org

The European Association of Nuclear Medicine (EANM) is the leading professional organisation for nuclear medicine in Europe. Established in 1985, EANM serves as an umbrella organisation comprising national societies, affiliated societies and individual members working in nuclear medicine or related fields. EANM is also dedicated to the promotion of nuclear medicine amongst other medical learned societies, EU institutions like the European Union, international organisations like the International Atomic Energy Agency, and the general public.

EANM has also obtained international recognition for its annual congress and for its European School of Multimodality Imaging & Therapy (ESMIT), launched in 2015 in Vienna, Austria. Additionally, EANM launched in 2025 its own two open-access, online-only, peer-reviewed medical journals — the EANM Journal and EANM Innovation — published by the world-leading publisher Elsevier.

== History ==
EANM was founded in 1985 in London, United Kingdom following the union of the Society of Nuclear Medicine Europe and the European Nuclear Medicine Society.

The first EANM Congress took place in 1988 in Milan, Italy. Since then, the EANM Annual Congresses have been taking place in multiples countries, including Austria, Belgium, Denmark, Finland, France, Germany, Greece, Italy, Portugal, Scotland, Spain, Sweden, Switzerland, The Netherlands, Turkey, and the United Kingdom.

EANM's headquarters are based in Vienna, Austria. EANM is also represented in Brussels, Belgium, where the organisation closely works with the European Commission and partner organisations.

== Structure ==
EANM is governed by an elected Board of international experts in nuclear medicine. The Board serves as the top executive body of the organisation. The elected Presidents, who serve a two-year mandate and represent the organisation, are supported by their team to expand EANM’s outreach.

Nuclear medicine being used in many medical disciplines, the EANM volunteers are divided into Committees and Councils, which focus on promoting nuclear medicine in different areas, including:

- Artificial intelligence
- Bone and joint
- Cardiovascular
- Dosimetry
- Ethics
- Inflammation & infection
- Molecular imaging & therapy
- Neuroimaging
- Oncology & Theranostics
- Paediatrics
- Physics
- Policy & regulatory affairs
- Radiation protection
- Radiopharmaceutical sciences
- Technologists
- Thyroid

The EANM Executive Office, based in Vienna (Austria), oversees all the logistical aspects, ranging from organising scientific events to managing publications and establishing new partnerships, and promoting the organisation among EU institutions and international organisations. The Executive Office also organises the Annual Congress and manages the ESMIT courses.

Membership-wise, EANM currently comprises 40 national societies, 20 non-European affiliated societies and 2,900 individual members from 80 countries in Europe and beyond. EANM is also supported by a team of over 150 volunteers, who work within the Board, the Committees, and the Councils.

== Activities ==
=== Annual Congress ===
The EANM Annual Congress features scientific sessions, workshops, and interactive discussions led by speakers. It brings together international experts and professionals in the field of nuclear medicine to discuss the latest advancements and innovations in nuclear medicine and molecular imaging.

=== EU Affairs ===
EANM closely works with EU institutions and EU policymakers to shed more light on the properties of nuclear medicine and to ensure that EU citizens have access to high-quality and safe therapeutic nuclear medicine.

For instance, as part of the European Commission’s SAMIRA Action Plan, EANM is part of the consortium performing the SIMPLERAD Project, which seeks to ensure that Euratom radiation protection requirements and the EU legislation concerning the therapeutic use of radiopharmaceuticals are implemented.

=== ESMIT ===
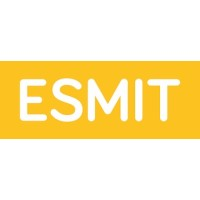
ESMIT's official logo

EANM is involved in education through training programmes, courses, and professional development initiatives. Its European School of Multimodality Imaging & Therapy (ESMIT) was founded in 2015 as a response to the rising demand for educational programmes focusing on nuclear medicine.

EANM launched ESMIT to equip health professionals with knowledge about both the modalities of nuclear medicine and its therapeutic applications. With the help of experienced faculty members, EANM thus offers a wide range of learning experiences, ranging from in-person advanced courses, to live webinars and an eLearning platform.

=== EARL ===
EANM established EANM Forschungs GmbH, also known as EANM Research Ltd. (EARL), in 2006 to promote standardised quantification in nuclear medicine imaging. As a subsidiary of EANM, EARL's primary goal is to enhance nuclear medicine practice, drive scientific initiatives, and facilitate clinical research projects.
