= Häcker (surname) =

Häcker is a surname. Notable people with the surname include:

- Birke Häcker (born 1977), German legal scholar
- Katharina Häcker (born 1986), German figure skater

== See also ==
- Hacker (surname)
