= Murrumbidgee Red Gums Important Bird Area =

Important Bird Area in New South Wales, Australia

Coordinates: 34°38′18″S 146°12′13″E

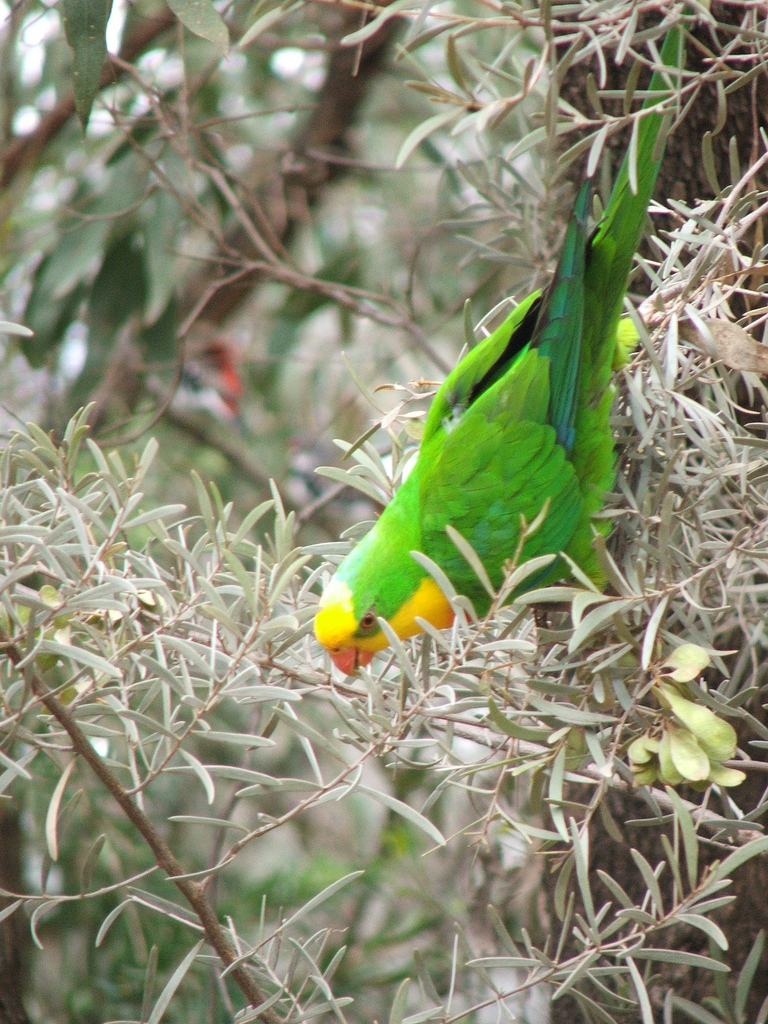
The IBA is an important site for superb parrots

The Murrumbidgee Red Gums Important Bird Area comprises a 2451 km^{2} discontinuous linear tract of land stretching along the Murrumbidgee River west, and downstream, from Wagga Wagga in the Riverina region of New South Wales, Australia. It includes riverine red gum forest with adjacent woodland and farmland. It adjoins the Riverina Plains Important Bird Area.

== Birds ==
The site has been identified by BirdLife International as an Important Bird Area (IBA) because the riverine red gum forest constitutes one of three breeding areas of the vulnerable superb parrot. The boundaries of the IBA are broadly defined as known superb parrot breeding habitat with a 10 km buffer zone of foraging habitat. It supports from 2000 to 4000 individual birds. Other notable birds recorded in the IBA include black-backed and Australasian bitterns, Australian painted snipes, bush stone-curlews, diamond firetails, flame robins and painted honeyeaters.
