= George Hacker =

American lawyer and activist

George A. Hacker is an American lawyer who has headed the Alcohol Policies Project of the Center for Science in the Public Interest (CSPI) for three decades. He is co-chair of the Coalition for the Prevention of Alcohol Problems, whose members include the National Council on Alcoholism and Drug Dependence (NCADD) and many other public health and prevention groups.

Between August 1989 and December 1992, Hacker directed alcohol programs at the Washington-based public interest support center, the Advocacy Institute. He also served as staff director for the National Coalition to Prevent Impaired Driving, a broad-based group of public health, traffic safety and law enforcement interests that promotes policies to reduce the toll of drinking driving in society.

At the Advocacy Institute, Hacker lead efforts to strengthen the ability of alcohol prevention policy advocates to use the media more effectively to educate the public and policy makers about environmental policy measures to reduce alcohol problems. The Institute provides training, technical assistance, informational materials and consultation on media advocacy issues.

As director for alcohol policies at the Center for Science in the Public Interest, Hacker has led national efforts to combat alcoholic beverage industry marketing and advertising practices, to increase long-dormant alcohol excise tax rates, and to require warning labels on alcoholic beverage containers. He is the author of numerous newspaper and magazine articles on alcohol issues, and an author of several CSPI publications, including Last Call for High Risk Bar Promotions, State Alcohol Taxes and Health, Marketing Booze to Blacks, and The Booze Merchants.
