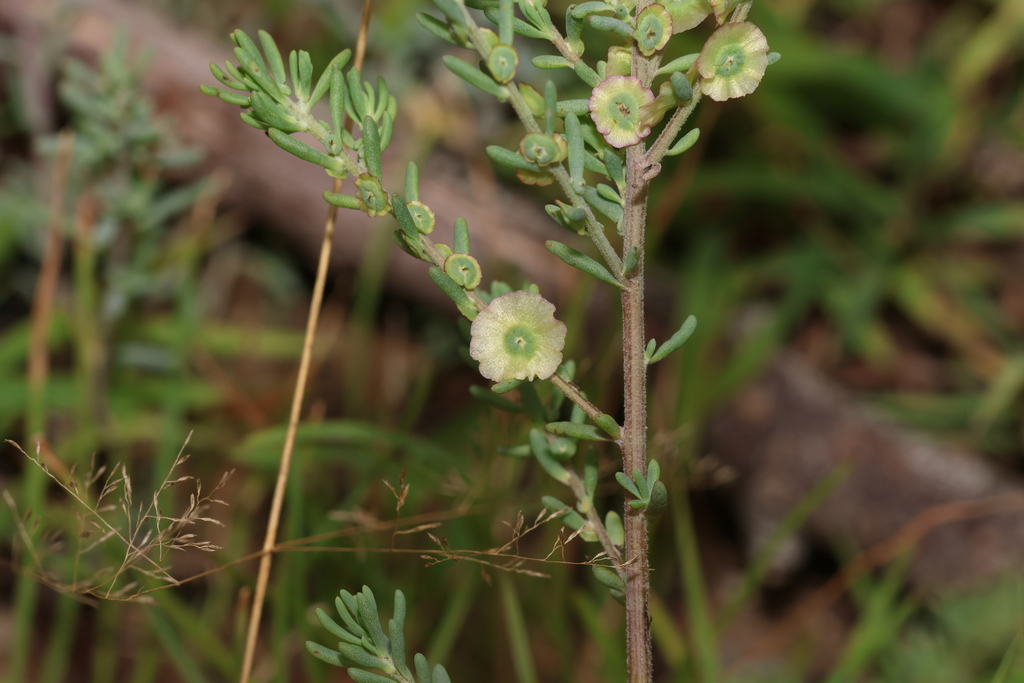
- Near Iredale

Scientific classification
- Kingdom: Plantae
- Clade: Tracheophytes
- Clade: Angiosperms
- Clade: Eudicots
- Order: Caryophyllales
- Family: Amaranthaceae
- Genus: Maireana
- Species: M. decalvans

Binomial name
- Maireana decalvans (Gand.) Paul G.Wilson

Synonyms
- Enchylaena decalvans Gand.; Kochia tomentosa var. tenuifolia (F.Muell. ex Benth.) J.M.Black; Kochia villosa var. tenuifolia F.Muell. ex Benth.

= Maireana decalvans =

Species of plant in the amaranth family

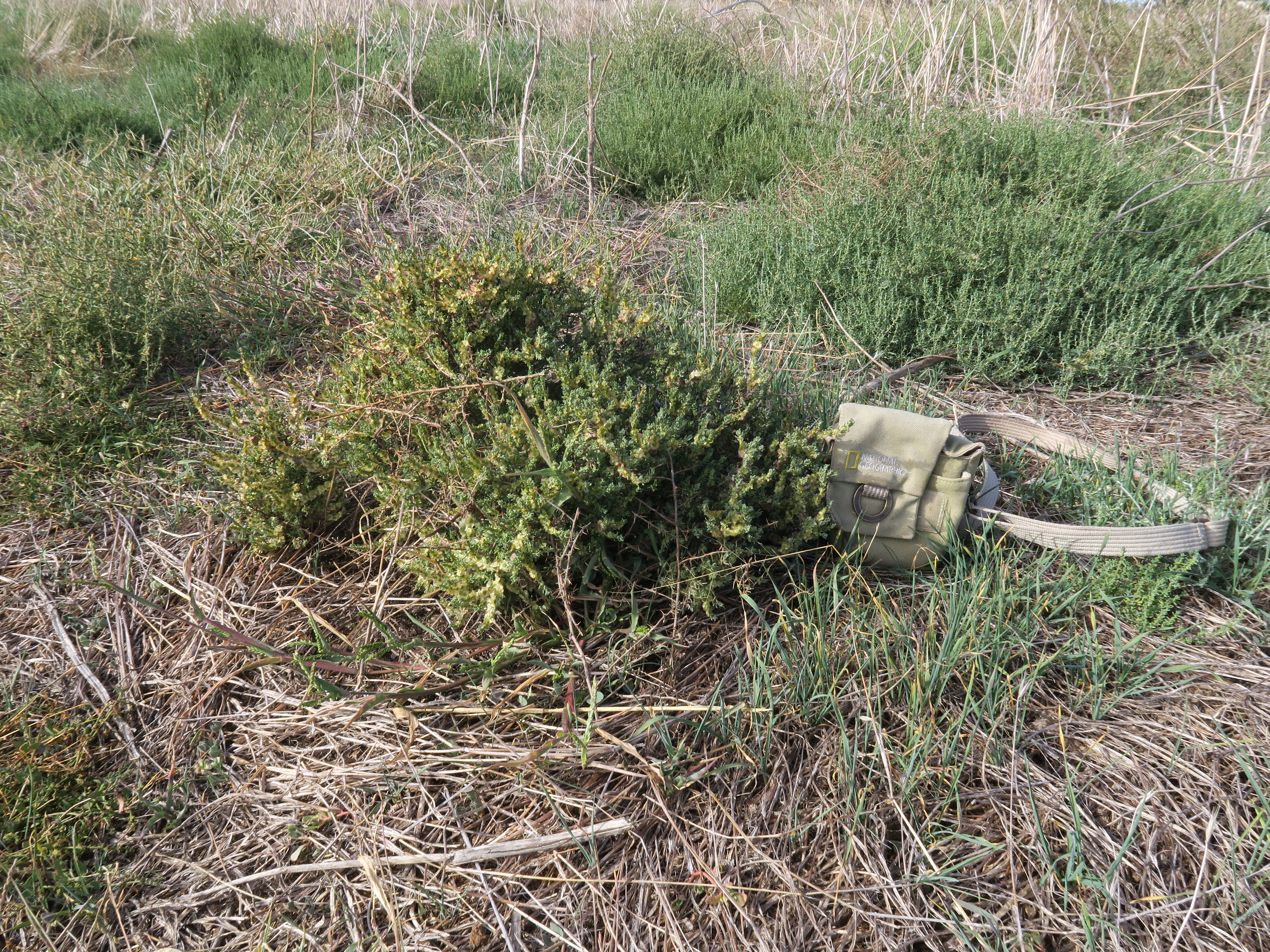
Habit near Gilgandra

Maireana decalvans, commonly known as black cottonbush, is a species of flowering plant in the family Amaranthaceae and is endemic to Australia. It is a erect to spreading perennial plant with fleshy, terete to narrowly spindle-shaped leaves, glabrous, bisexual flowers arranged singly, and a hairy fruiting perianth with a hemispherical tube and a thin-walled wing.

== Description ==
Maireana decalvans is an erect to spreading, bushy perennial that typically grows to a height of up to 50 cm (20 in) and thin branches. Its leaves are arranged alternately, circular in cross section to narrowly spindle-shaped, 5–8 mm (0.20–0.31 in) long, glabrous and fleshy. The flowers are bisexual, glabrous and arranged singly in leaf axils, the fruiting perianth with a thin-walled tube about 3 mm (0.12 in) in diameter and a thin wing about 8 mm (0.31 in) in diameter with a single radial slit.

== Taxonomy ==
This species was first formally described in 1919 by Michel Gandoger who gave it the name Enchylaena decalvans in the Bulletin de la Société Botanique de France from specimens collected in the Wimmera district. In 1975, Paul G. Wilson transferred the species to Maireana as M. decalvans in the journal Nuytsia. The specific epithet (decalvans) means 'becoming bald', referring to the stems.

== Distribution and habitat ==
Black cottonbush grows in heavy, seasonally wet, waterlogged soil and is sometimes a coloniser of cleared land. In is found in western New South Wales, mainly along the Murray River floodplain, the mid-west and Melbourne-Bacchus Marsh areas of Victoria, the south-east of South Australia and south-eastern Queensland. It has also been naturalised in the Cape Provinces of South Africa.

== Conservation status ==
Maireana decalvans is listed as of "least concern" under the Queensland Government Nature Conservation Act 1992, but as "endangered" in South Australia.
