= Hans Hacker =

German-American designer and painter

- Born: March 4, 1910; Waldenburg
- Died: December 27, 1994 (aged 84)
- Education: Breslau Art School
- Occupations: Ceramic decal designer, painter
- Employer(s): E. Wunderlich and Company, Commercial Decal
- Spouse: Johanna "Hanna" Krause (m. 1934)
- Elected: Lou Holtz Upper Ohio Valley Hall of Fame

Hans Hacker (March 4, 1910 – December 27, 1994) was a ceramic decal designer and painter.

Hacker was born on March 4, 1910, in the city of Waldenburg (now Wałbrzych), Germany. Waldenburg was in the Silesia Province and became part of Poland after World War II. Hacker was one of seven children. His father August was a commercial ceramics artist and his mother, Eliese Moore Hacker, was a kindergarten teacher.

Hacker was showing and selling paintings by the time he was 11 or 12 years old. He graduated from the Breslau Art School in Breslau, Germany.

== Family ==
On October 22, 1934, Hacker married Johanna "Hanna" Krause, a daughter of Heinrich and Selma Spatscheck Krause. A native of Hacker's village, she had been born on October 1, 1913. They had three children. Hanna Hacker died January 12, 2008, in Burlington, Vermont, at the age of 94.

== Professional career ==
As an adult, Hacker worked as head designer for E. Wunderlich and Company (a large producer of decals for the worldwide ceramics industry) in Germany. As a representative for Wunderlich, he first visited East Liverpool, Ohio (a center of pottery production, with 24 potteries in the area at the time) in 1932. He traveled back and forth between Germany and Ohio over the next half dozen years, tending to the growing business relationship between Wunderlich and Commercial Decal which made ceramics decals in the USA.

As the Nazis came to power in Germany in 1933, Hacker and his family sought to leave the country and decided to settle permanently in East Liverpool in 1939. Hacker was hired by Commercial Decal as an art consultant for its East Liverpool decal plant. He was later named art and technical director of Commercial Decal. He retired from Commercial Decal in 1977, although he continued working as a consultant for many years afterward.

His work is known for perfecting the slide-off decal method. Hacker became a celebrated decal and ceramic designer and the most prolific designer of dinnerware patterns in history.

== Fine artist ==
In addition to his work in the ceramics industry, Hacker was a painter who exhibited equal skill with oils and watercolors. He painted hundreds of scenes of East Liverpool and the surrounding area—including many paintings of Little Beaver Creek and the historic small village of Fredericktown six miles north of East Liverpool. He also did numerous paintings of northern West Virginia, just across the Ohio River from East Liverpool. His works are a comprehensive historic and visual record of two centuries of life in the area.

== Accolades and awards ==
Hacker's work is exhibited at the Smithsonian Institution and the Butler Institute of American Art in Youngstown, Ohio. Additionally, a number of East Liverpool institutions and businesses such as the Museum of Ceramics, the Carnegie Library and the Dawson Funeral Home have Hacker's work on display.

On August 16, 1985, for his contribution to East Liverpool history and culture, Hacker was honored by the East Liverpool Historical Society with a "Hans Hacker Appreciation Dinner."

At that time, Jack Lanam, former curator of the East Liverpool Historical Society said, "Take his paintings and put them together like a jigsaw puzzle, lay them out, and you have a city [East Liverpool]."

Fellow renowned ceramic artist Don Schreckengost pointed out at the dinner that Hacker was unusual in his ability to pursue fine art as a prolific avocation while working in commercial art as his livelihood.

"Oftentimes a person doing commercial art for industry has a hard time finding time to do art for a hobby," said Schreckengost. "East Liverpool has been fortunate to have someone of his stature to live here as a citizen, and to contribute to the community."

"He lived at a time when he was able to make sketches and make records with his camera," said Schreckengost. But, he added, Hacker "does things that a camera can't always do, with the feeling for light and the feeling for the time. He sees a lot more than meets the average person's eye - that's what a true artist does."

East Liverpool Mayor Norm Bucher designated August 16, 1985, as "Hans Hacker Day" in the city, and the first-ever lifetime membership in the Historical Society was granted that day to Hacker.

On June 22, 2007, Hacker was posthumously inducted into the Lou Holtz Upper Ohio Valley Hall of Fame in East Liverpool, Ohio. Frank C. Dawson, Holtz President, said, "There is no way to measure the impact of his work. He was so gifted and talented that his work will live on for years to come."

The next day, Hacker was also honored with an art exhibition, jointly sponsored by the East Liverpool Historical Society and the Kent State-East Liverpool Branch.

At that time, East Liverpool Historical Society President Tim Brookes said that East Liverpool was fortunate to "end up as the adoptive home of someone so creative."

"Due to his interest and talent, he was able to preserve and document the appearance of structures that have ceased to exist, and specific moments in time from the city's past have been preserved in his work, hopefully forever," said Brookes.

== Death ==
Hacker died on December 27, 1994.
