= Benedikt Hacker =

Austrian composer and music publisher (1769–1829)

Benedikt Hacker (30 May 1769 – 2 May 1829) was an Austrian composer and music publisher.

== Biography ==
Benedikt Hacker was born on 30 May 1769 in Metten. From a young age he showed musical talent. He studied medicine, yet later he gave up and studied piano and organ with Johann Baptist Sternkopf. Hacker went to Salzburg in 1783, where he became acquainted with Modest Schmetterer, who arranged for him to study with Leopold Mozart (violin) and Michael Haydn (piano). He had a position as a violinist at Nonnberg Abbey. From 1786 he was in the Salzburg court and a clerk at bookshops. Hacker maintained a close relationship with Michael Haydn, whom he described as his "venerable teacher in the art of music." He was also a member of Haydn's quartet and published the composer's church music.

On 1 January 1803, Hacker opened his own bookstore with a music library for borrowing and a music hall. In debt, he committed suicide by jumping into the Salzach near Salzburg on 2 May 1829. Cyprian Vesco maintained Hacker's bookstore afterwards.

== Music ==
The composer wrote secular songs and hymns, a quartet, an opera, seven masses, and a Requiem mass. While Hacker's music is clearly influenced by Michael Haydn's, he still retains a distinct style of slow, sustained melodies and sophisticated harmony.
