= Murrumbidgee Co-operative Milling =

Coordinates: 35°7′11″S 147°22′16″E

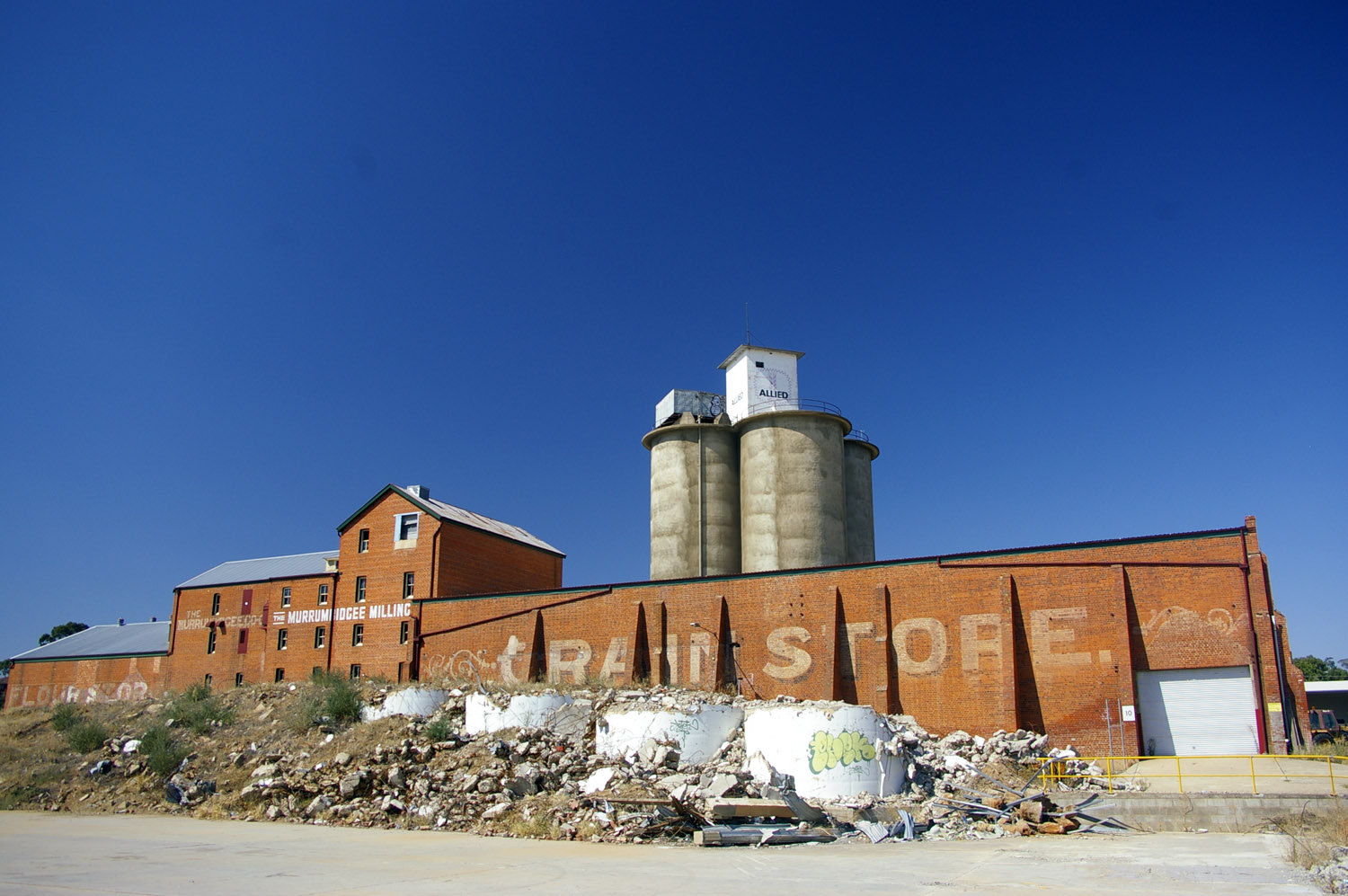
Former Murrumbidgee Co-operative Milling building

Murrumbidgee Co-operative Milling was built in 1890 in Wagga Wagga, New South Wales. After the Co-operative closed its operation in the 1980s the site was sold in 1987 to Goodman Fielder, operating for approximately a decade before ceasing its operation in December 2000. The Milling Co-operative was the second largest flour milling company in New South Wales outside Sydney.

== Future ==
The heritage-listed milling site is currently under a $35 million redevelopment which will restore the historic building back to its former glory.
