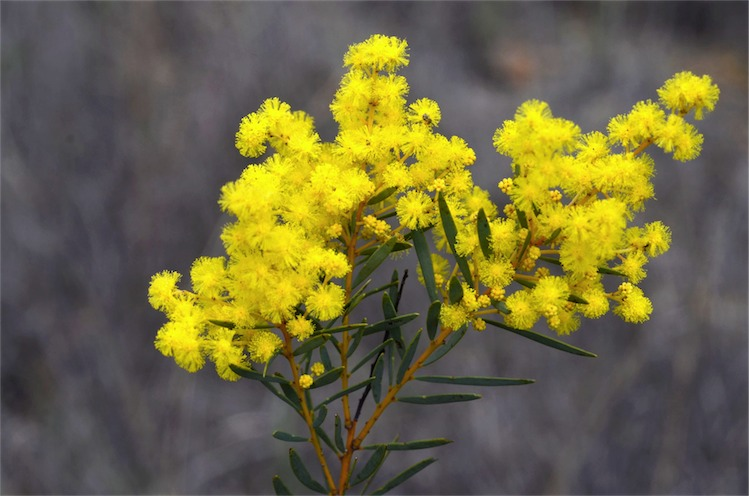
- Near Bingara

Scientific classification
- Kingdom: Plantae
- Clade: Tracheophytes
- Clade: Angiosperms
- Clade: Eudicots
- Clade: Rosids
- Order: Fabales
- Family: Fabaceae
- Subfamily: Caesalpinioideae
- Clade: Mimosoid clade
- Genus: Acacia
- Species: A. decora

Binomial name
- Acacia decora Rchb.
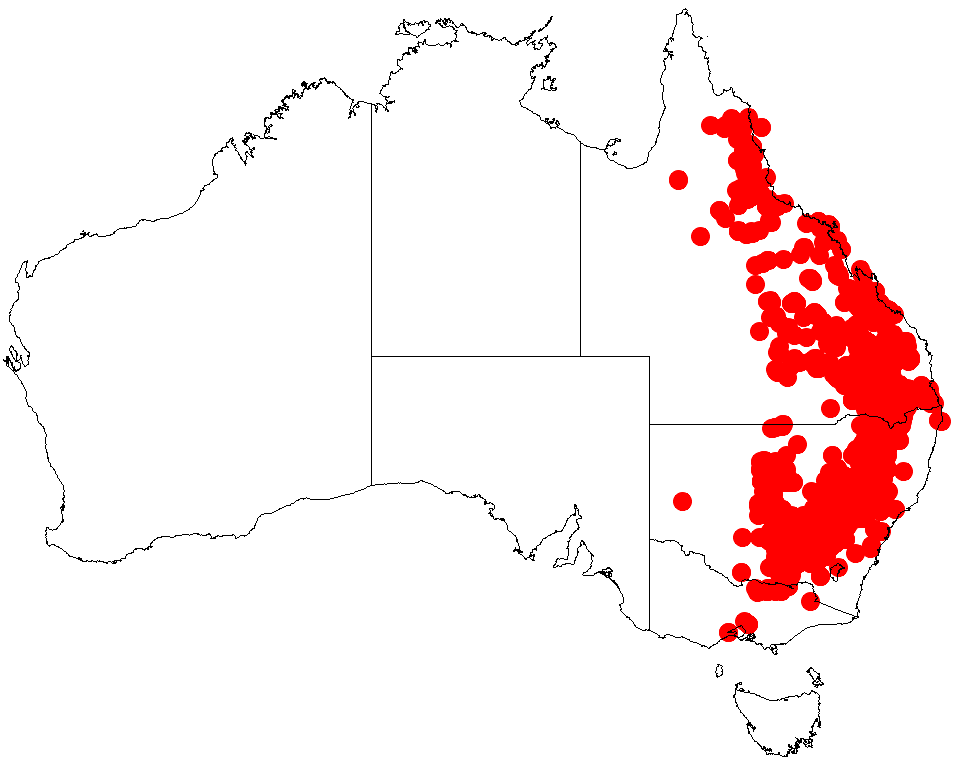
- Occurrence data from AVH

Synonyms
- List: Acacia buxifolia var. decora (Rchb.) C.Moore; Acacia caleyi A.Cunn. ex Benth.; Acacia decora (narrow phyllode variant); Acacia decora var. biglandulosa Domin; Acacia decora Rchb. var. decora; Acacia decora var. macrophylla T.Mitch.; Acacia decora var. typica Domin nom. inval.; Acacia podalyriifolia var. caleyi (A.Cunn. ex Benth.) Domin; Racosperma caleyi (A.Cunn. ex Benth.) Pedley; Racosperma decorum (Rchb.) Pedley

= Acacia decora =

Species of plant

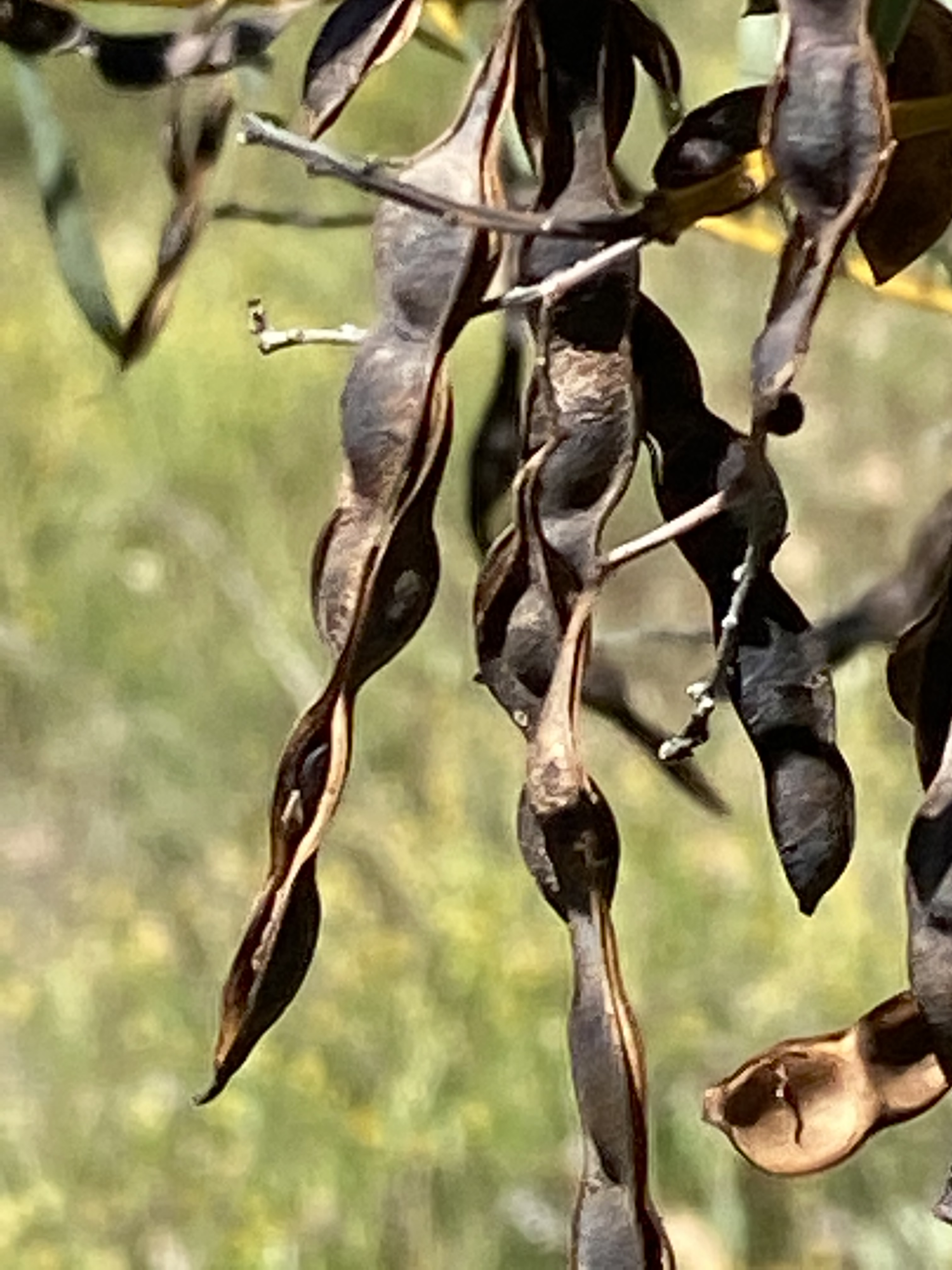
Seed pods

Acacia decora, commonly known as western silver wattle and showy wattle and other common names, is a species of flowering plant in the family Fabaceae and is endemic to eastern Australia. It is a shrub with lance-shaped, narrowly elliptic or more or less linear phyllodes, spherical heads of golden yellow flowers and papery to leathery pods.

== Description ==
Acacia decora is a shrub that typically grows to a height of 1–3 m (3 ft 3 in – 9 ft 10 in) and has ribbed, usually glabrous branchlets. Its phyllodes are borne on raised stem-projections and are lance-shaped or narrowly lance-shaped with the narrower end towards the base, narrowly elliptic to more or less linear, usually 20–60 mm (0.79–2.36 in) long 3.5–10 mm (0.14–0.39 in) wide and greyish green to glaucous, with a prominent midvein and obscure lateral veins. There are one or two glands 5–15 mm (0.20–0.59 in) above the base of the phyllodes. The flowers are borne in spherical heads in many racemes 20–60 mm (0.79–2.36 in) long on peduncles 3–6 mm (0.12–0.24 in) long. Each head is 4.5–6 mm (0.18–0.24 in) in diameter with 15 to 30 bright yellow or golden yellow flowers. Flowering occurs between April and October, and the pods are straight to slightly curved, firmly papery to thinly leathery, 50–100 mm (2.0–3.9 in) long and 4–7 mm (0.16–0.28 in) wide, more or less flat or straight-sided and slightly constricted between the seeds. The seeds are more or less oblong, 4–6 mm (0.16–0.24 in) long and shiny black with a large aril.

Victorian examples of the species have branchlets covered with minute hairs, pressed against the surface.

== Taxonomy ==
Acacia decora was first formally described in 1829 by the botanist Ludwig Reichenbach in his book Iconographia Botanica Exotica. The specific epithet (decora) is derived from the Latin word decorus in reference to the plant's graceful appearance.

Common names for A. decora include western silver wattle, showy wattle, western golden wattle, pretty wattle, golden wattle and many others.

== Distribution ==
Western silver wattle is found down the east coast of Australia extending from the Palmer River area in north Queensland, through New South Wales to Victoria. In New South Wales, A. decora is widespread through the central part of the state and west to the Cobar district. It commonly grows on rocky ridges or oucrops in Eucalyptus communities, sometimes as pure stands. In Victoria it is only known from around Dookie and Thoona and near Wodonga where it is restricted to roadsides and remnants of open woodland along railway lines.

== Conservation status ==
This species is listed as "endangered" under the Victorian Government Flora and Fauna Guarantee Act 1988.

== Use in horticulture ==
Acacia decora is a hardy species which can tolerate a wide range of conditions. It grows best in well drained soils and in a full sun to partly shady position. It can be grown from seed but must be pretreated by scarification or with boiling water.

== See also ==
- List of Acacia species
