= Alf Hacker =

Australian rules footballer, born 1912

Personal information
- Full name: Alfred Hubert William Hacker
- Born: 4 July 1912; Urana, New South Wales
- Died: 15 December 1970 (aged 58); Footscray, Victoria
- Original team: Oaklands
- Height: 180 cm (5 ft 11 in)
- Weight: 81 kg (179 lb)

Playing career^{1}
Years	Club	Games (Goals)
1936, 1938, 1943	North Melbourne	24 (0)
- ^{1} Playing statistics correct to the end of 1943.

Alfred Hubert William Hacker (4 July 1912 – 15 December 1970) was an Australian rules footballer who played for the North Melbourne Football Club in the Victorian Football League (VFL).
