= Riverina Plains Important Bird Area =

Important Bird Area in New South Wales, Australia

Coordinates: 34°50′46″S 145°26′52″E

The Riverina Plains Important Bird Area comprises some 10,668 km^{2} of agricultural grassland in the Riverina region of New South Wales, Australia. Much of the site lies roughly between Hay, Jerilderie and Hanwood, straddling, but with most of it lying south of, the Murrumbidgee River. It adjoins the Murrumbidgee Red Gums IBA.

== Birds ==
The site has been identified by BirdLife International as an Important Bird Area (IBA) because it contains most of the habitat suitable for plains-wanderers in the Riverina. It also has good populations of other grassland birds, including brown songlarks, Australian pipits, banded lapwings and singing bushlarks, as well as the arid biome restricted inland dotterel.
