= Urana =

- Town
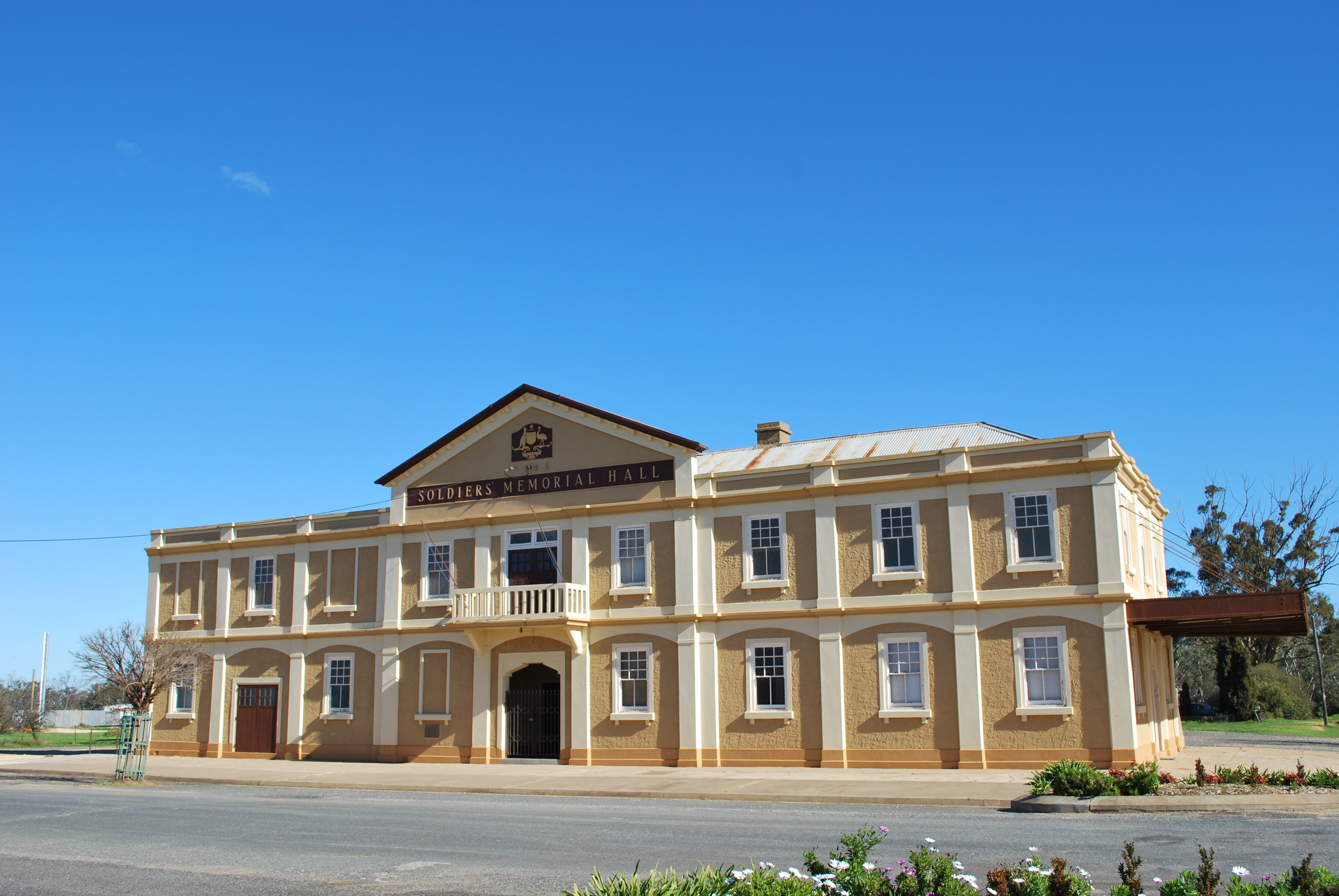
- Memorial Hall, Urana

- Coordinates: 35°19′0″S 146°16′0″E
- Country: Australia
- State: New South Wales
- LGA: Federation Council
- Location: 561 km (349 mi) from Sydney; 366 km (227 mi) from Melbourne; 111 km (69 mi) from Wagga Wagga; 125 km (78 mi) from Albury
- Established: 6 May 1859

Government
  - State electorate: Albury
  - Federal division: Farrer
- Elevation: 125.0 m (410.1 ft)

Population
  - Total: 248 (2021 census)
- Postcode: 2645
- County: Urana
- Mean max temp: 23.7 °C (74.7 °F)
- Mean min temp: 9.5 °C (49.1 °F)
- Annual rainfall: 447.0 mm (17.60 in)

Urana /jəˈrænə/ is a small town in the Riverina region of New South Wales, Australia. The town is in the Federation Council local government area.

Urana is located between Lockhart and Jerilderie, about 561 kilometres (349 mi) southwest of the state capital, Sydney. To the west lies Lake Urana and the Lake Urana Nature Reserve. To the east lies a smaller lake, Lake Uranagong.

Urana was the major town and headquarters of the former Urana Shire. The shire included the localities of Boree Creek, Morundah, Oaklands and Rand. The Urana district is used for raising sheep and for growing wheat and other grain crops.

In the 2016 census, the population of Urana was 298, of whom 56.3% were male and 43.7% were female. Aboriginal and Torres Strait Islander people made up 3.7% of the population. In the 2021 census, the population of Urana was 248, of whom 55.1% were male and 44.9% were female. Aboriginal and Torres Strait Islander people made up 5.6% of the population.

== History ==
The origin of the name Urana is likely to come from a Wiradjuri word "airana" used to describe a temporary shelter (usually consisting of a simple frame of branches covered with bark, leaves, or grass). Alternatively it comes from "aurana" for camping ground or noise of quails flying.

The area was home to the Wiradjuri Aboriginal people prior to European occupation and the expansion of squatters to set up stations. Urana was first settled by Europeans during the 1850s. In May 1859 a design for the "Town of Urana" by Surveyor Hayes was approved by the New South Wales Executive Council.

Urana Post Office opened on 1 January 1861.

In August 1863 near Urana the notorious bushranger, Dan Morgan, and his accomplice Clarke held up the Police Magistrate based at Wagga Wagga, Henry Baylis. A few days after this incident Baylis led a party of policemen to the bushrangers' camp; shots were exchanged and both Baylis and the bushranger Clarke were wounded. Morgan and Clarke both escaped on this occasion.

In 1866 Urana township consisted of two public houses, the Urana Hotel and the Royal Hotel. In addition there was a post-office, two large stores, and a police-station and lock-up. A new court-house was erected at Urana in 1879.

Urana Shire Council was proclaimed in 1906 and dissolved in 2016, to become part of the Federation Council.

== Religion ==
During 1882 a Roman Catholic church was completed, with Father Burmingham celebrating the first service on 7 January 1883.

The Rev. George Wilson Adam was the first Presbyterian minister of the separate parish of Urana (at that time administered from Victoria). Rev. Adam's term extended from 1878 to 1887. His successor, Rev. Matthew Bell, was a part of the Presbyterian Church of New South Wales; he was inducted in 1888 and resigned in 1904. During Rev. Bell's tenure at Urana three wooden churches were built: one at Urana, and one each at the district preaching centres, Old Goree and Boree Creek.

== Sport and recreation ==
The Urana Football Club was an Australian Rules Football club established in April 1898 at a meeting in the Commercial Hotel. Urana's first published match was against Lockhart in August, 1898, losing by four goals to a more experienced side. In 1901, Urana won all there games they played in. In 1909 the Urana & District Football Association was formed at a meeting from the following club's - Daysdale, Oaklands and Urana.

Former Corowa Football Club premiership coach, Ray "Nana" Baker was coach of Urana Football Club in 1934.

Former Urana footballer, Max Urquhart was recruited to Collingwood Football Club in 1963.

Competitions played in

The Urana FC played in the following competitions.

- 1909: Urana & District Football Association
- 1911–1914: Lockhart & District Football Association. Premiers - 1914
- 1915: Club active but did not play in any official competition.
- 1916–1918: Club in recess due to World War One.
- 1919–1920: Club active but did not play in any official competition.
- 1921–1922: Lockhart & District Football Association. 1921 Premiers: Pleasant Hills
- 1923: The Rock Oaklands Lines Football Association: Premiers - Oaklands FC
- 1924: The Lockhart Oaklands Lines Football Association: Premiers - Oaklands FC
- 1925–1926: Club in recess.
- 1927–1928: Club reformed in May 1927. Club active but did not play in any official competition.
- 1929–1930: Coreen & District Football League: Urana applied for admission into the Coreen & District Football League in 1929, but were initially knocked back.
- 1931: Southern Riverina Football Association
- 1932–1935: Corowa & District Football Association
- 1936–1937: Faithful & District Football Association
- 1938: Club in recess.
- 1939–1945: Club in recess due to World War Two.
- 1946–1972: Coreen & District Football League. Merged with Cullivel in 1946 and played in the Coreen & District Football League from 1946 to 1972 as Urana Cullivel FC. Premiers: 1953, 1957, 1958, 1959, 1966, 1967.
- 1973–2003: Coreen & District Football League. Played as the Urana FC. Thirds Premiers: 1989
- 2004–2007: Coreen & District Football League. Merged with Oaklands FC to form the Billabong Crows in 2004.
- 2008–2022: Hume Football League. Played as the Billabong Crows FC

Urana also formerly had a rugby league team which competed in the Group 13 Rugby League competition.

== Heritage listings ==
Urana has a number of heritage-listed sites, including:

- Urana Soldiers' Memorial Hall

== Climate ==
Urana has a cold semi-arid climate (Köppen BSk), a little too dry to be a humid subtropical climate, characterised by hot summers with pleasant mornings and clear skies, and cool winters with moderate cloud cover. Seasonal range is great across the year.

Climate data for Urana Post Office (1914–1975, rainfall 1871–2024); 125 m AMSL; 35.33° S, 146.27° E
Month	Jan	Feb	Mar	Apr	May	Jun	Jul	Aug	Sep	Oct	Nov	Dec	Year
Mean daily maximum °C (°F)	32.9 (91.2)	32.4 (90.3)	29.2 (84.6)	23.6 (74.5)	18.7 (65.7)	14.8 (58.6)	14.2 (57.6)	16.0 (60.8)	19.8 (67.6)	23.5 (74.3)	27.7 (81.9)	31.1 (88.0)	23.7 (74.6)
Mean daily minimum °C (°F)	16.3 (61.3)	16.3 (61.3)	14.0 (57.2)	9.4 (48.9)	6.1 (43.0)	3.6 (38.5)	3.2 (37.8)	4.1 (39.4)	6.3 (43.3)	8.8 (47.8)	11.8 (53.2)	14.6 (58.3)	9.5 (49.2)
Average rainfall mm (inches)	33.2 (1.31)	33.3 (1.31)	35.6 (1.40)	32.8 (1.29)	41.1 (1.62)	45.0 (1.77)	38.5 (1.52)	39.6 (1.56)	38.4 (1.51)	41.7 (1.64)	34.7 (1.37)	33.2 (1.31)	447.0 (17.60)
Average rainy days (≥ 0.2 mm)	3.8	3.5	4.0	4.7	6.5	8.4	8.7	8.6	6.8	6.1	4.8	4.0	69.9

== Notable residents ==
Notable people from Urana include:

- Bill Brownless, Australian rules footballer was born at the Urana Hospital
- Billy Field, Singer
- Fred Fox, The Queen's milliner
- Alf Hacker, Australian rules footballer
- Dame Ella Macknight
- Norm Provan, Rugby league player
- Max Urquhart, Australian rules footballer

== Gallery ==
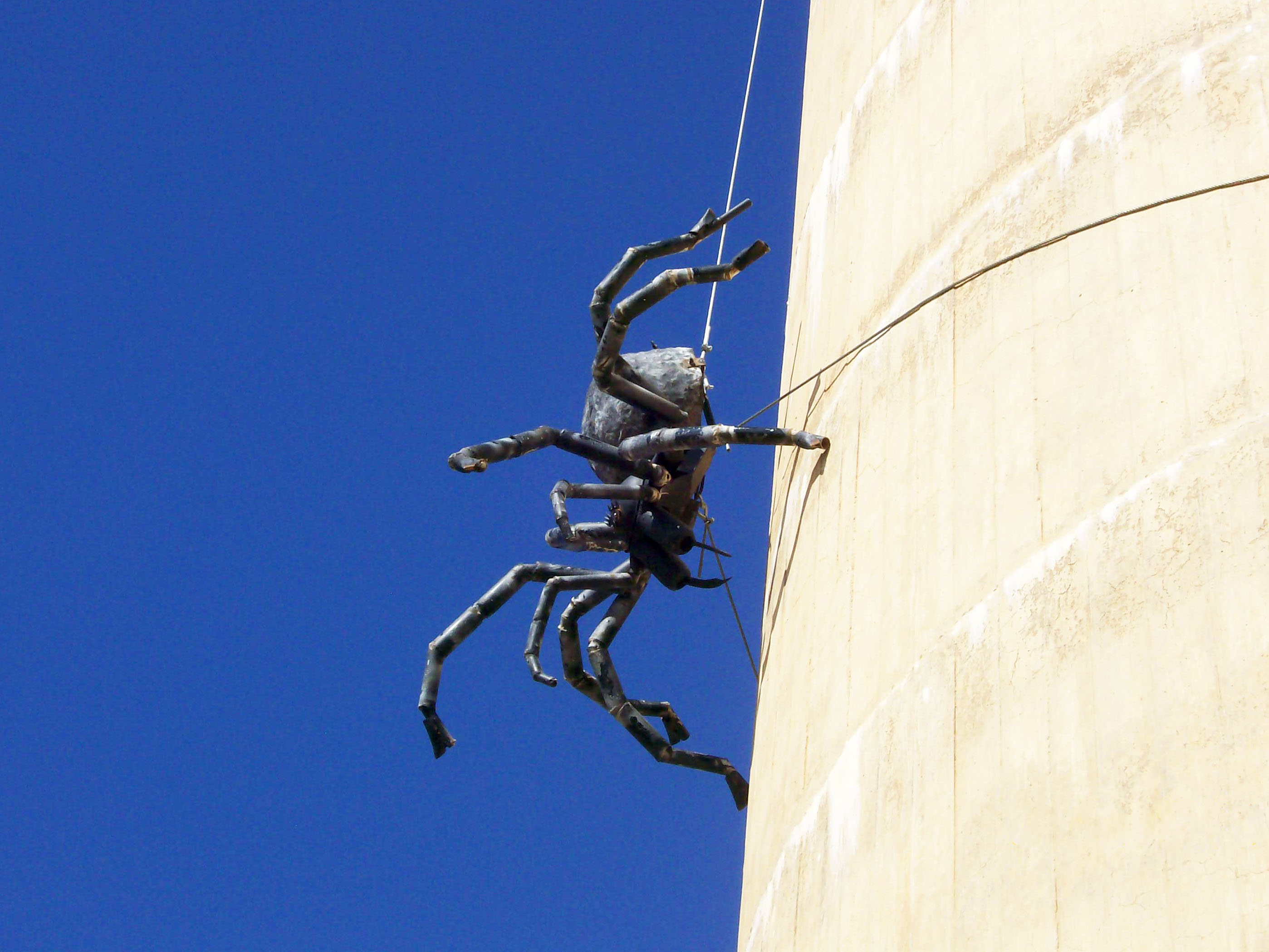
Sculpture 'Itsy Bitsy' by local artist Andrew Whitehead on the water tower.

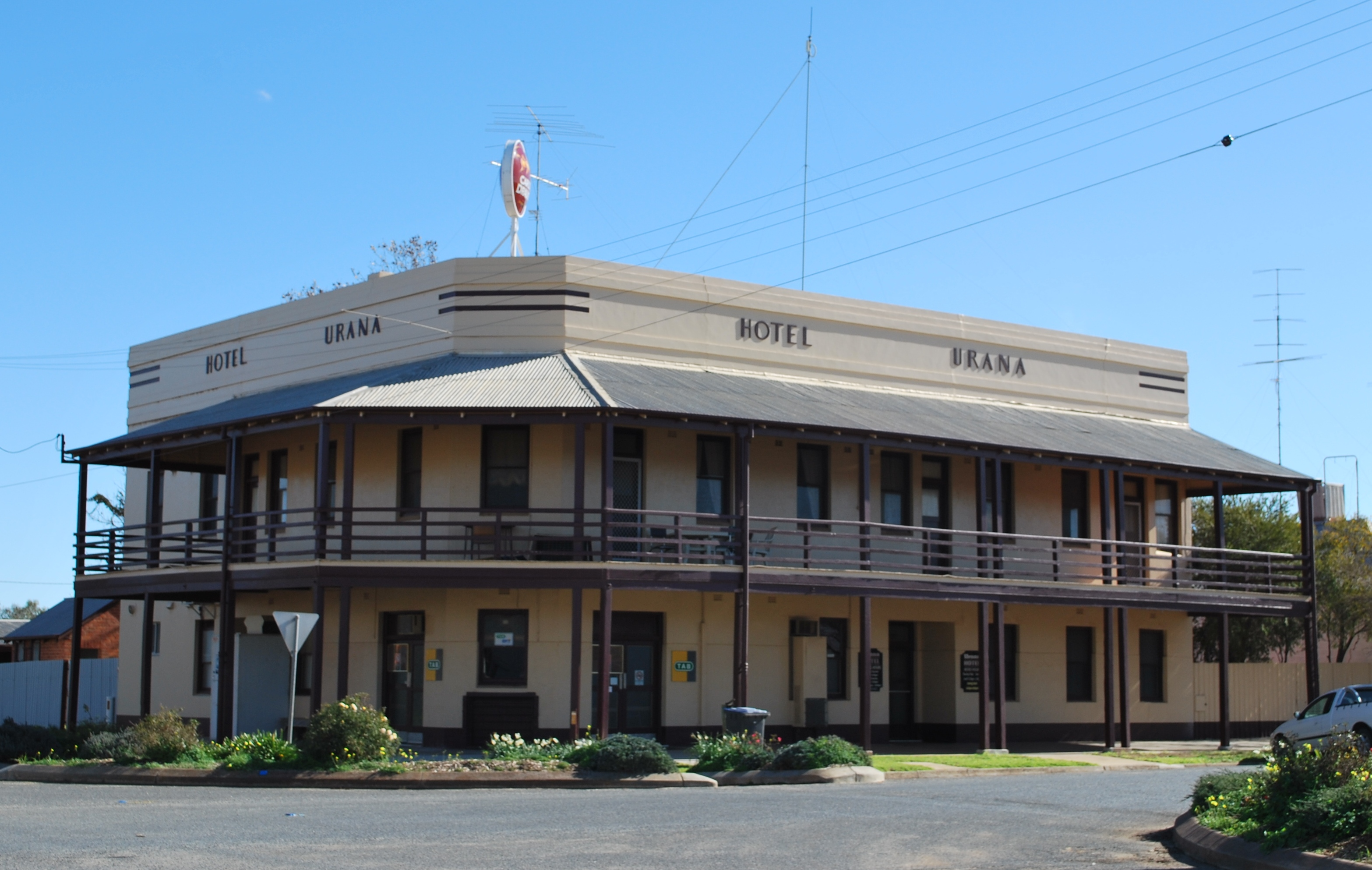
Hotel Urana, the only remaining pub in Urana.

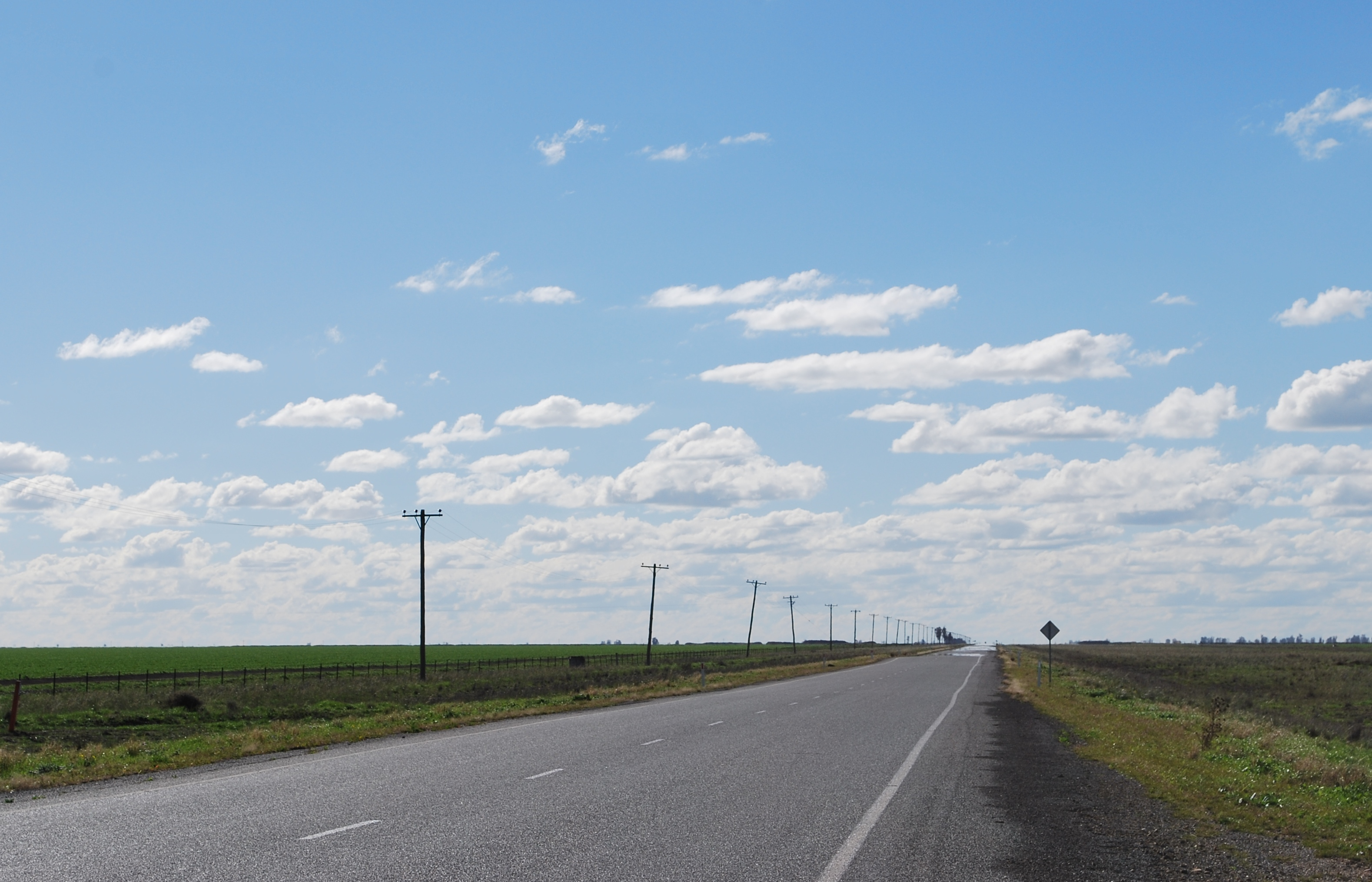
The flat Urana plain

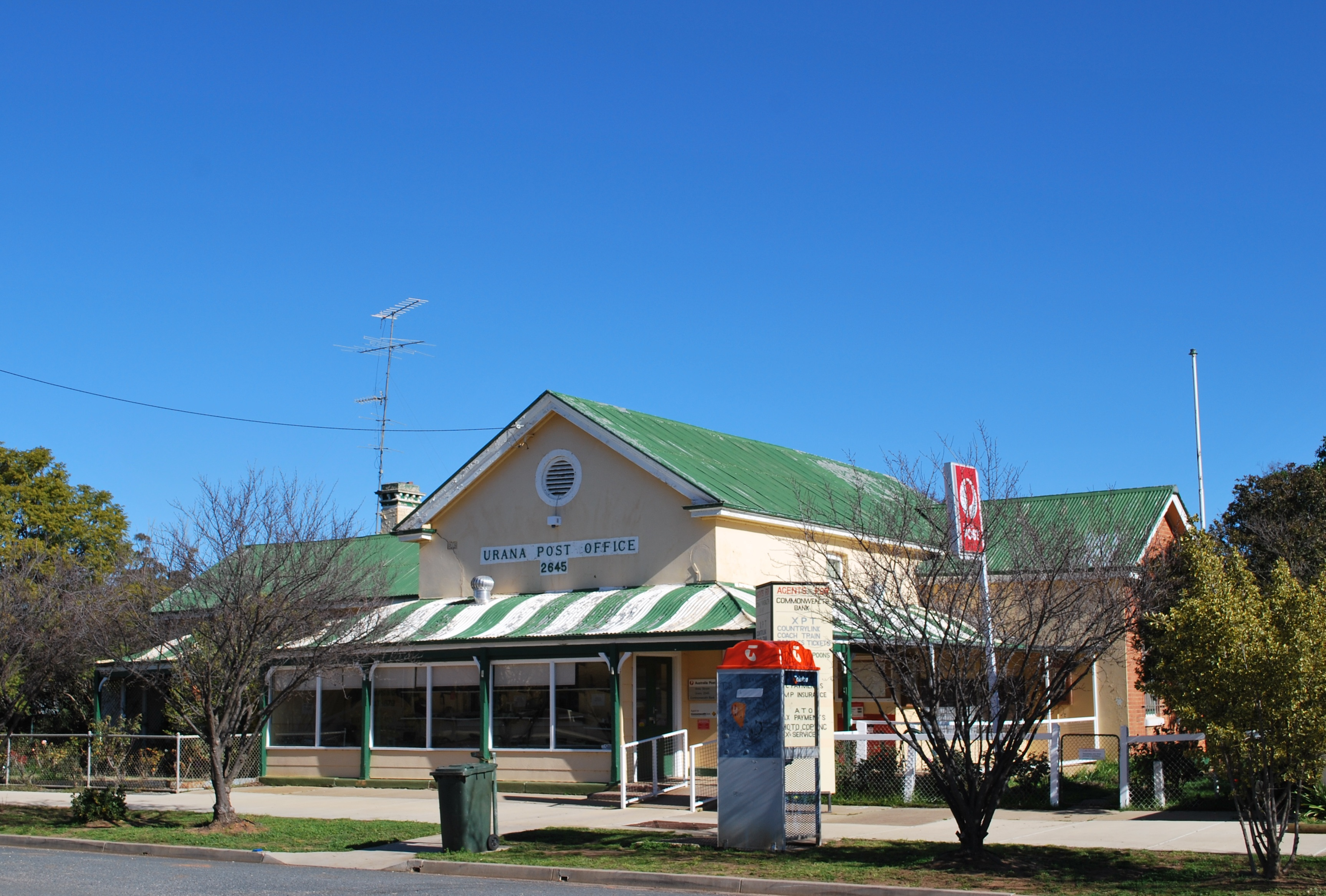
Historic post office

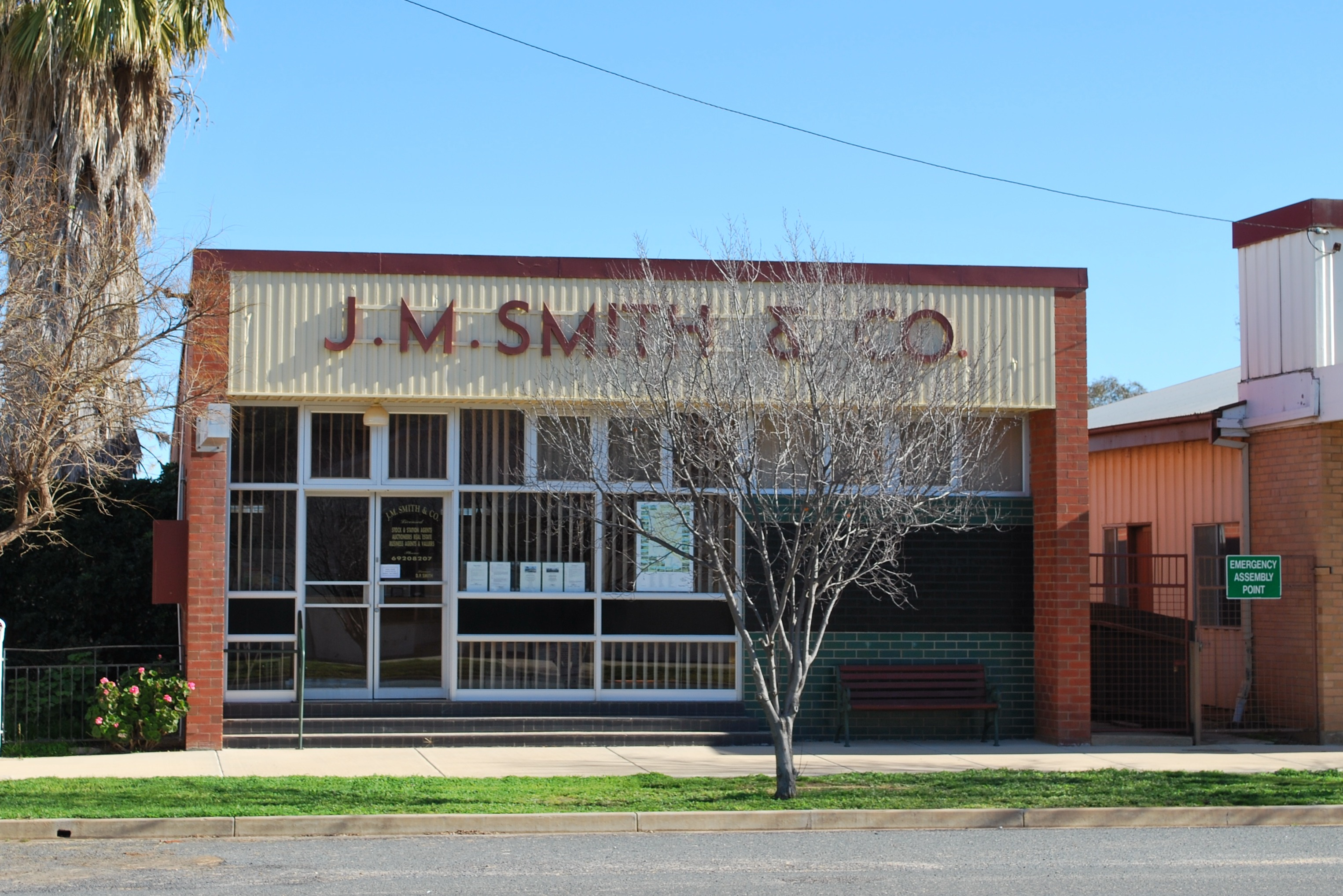
JM Smith office

== See also ==
- Lake Urana

Preceding station	Former services	Following station
Uranagong towards Oaklands	Oaklands Line	Cullivel towards The Rock
