= Theranostics =

Combination of cancer diagnosis and treatment

Theranostics, or theragnostics, refers to the combination of diagnosis and therapy (treatment) of disease in a single medical intervention or technique. For example, a combination of radioactive isotopes may be administered to simultaneously image and treat cancerous lesions. Typically theranostic approaches involve a medical imaging component, such as radiotracers, contrast agents, positron emission tomography, and magnetic resonance imaging.

The term "theranostic" is a portmanteau of two words, therapeutic and diagnostic. The first known use of the term is attributed to John Funkhouser, a consultant for the company Cardiovascular Diagnostic, who used it in a press release in August 1998. Nanotheranostics is the specialization of theranostics in the nanoscale.

== Applications ==
=== Nuclear medicine ===
Theranostics originated in the field of nuclear medicine; iodine isotope 131 for the diagnostic study and treatment of thyroid cancer was one of its earliest applications. Nuclear medicine encompasses various substances, either alone or in combination, that can be used for diagnostic imaging and targeted therapy. These substances may include ligands of receptors present on the target tissue or compounds, like iodine, that are internalized by the target through metabolic processes. By using these mechanisms, theranostics enables the localization of pathological tissues with imaging and the targeted destruction of these tissues using high doses of radiation.

==== Theranostic pairs ====
When two isotopes of an element form a theranostic agent they can be called a theranostic pair, eg. Cu-64 and Cu-67. Cu-64 emits positrons for imaging in PET scans, and Cu-67 is a beta emitter to kill targeted cells.

=== Radiological scope ===
Contrast agents with therapeutic properties have been under development for several years. One example is the design of contrast agents capable of releasing a chemotherapeutic agent locally at the target site, triggered by a stimulus provided by the operator. This localized approach aims to increase treatment efficacy and minimize side effects. For instance, ultrasound-based contrast media, such as microbubbles, can accumulate in hypervascularized tissues and release the active ingredient in response to ultrasound waves, thus targeting a specific area chosen by the sonographer.

Another approach involves linking monoclonal antibodies (capable of targeting different molecular targets) to nanoparticles. This strategy enhances the drug's affinity and specificity towards the target and enables visualization of the treatment area, such as using superparamagnetic iron oxide particles detectable by magnetic resonance imaging. Additionally, these particles can be designed to release chemotherapy agents specifically at the site of binding, producing a local synergistic effect with antibody action. Integrating these methods with medical-nuclear techniques, which offer greater imaging sensitivity, may aid in target identification and treatment monitoring.

== Imaging techniques ==
=== Positron emission tomography ===
Positron emission tomography (PET) imaging in theranostics provides insight into metabolic and molecular processes within the body. The PET scanner detects photons and creates three-dimensional images that enable visualization and quantification of physiological and biochemical processes. PET imaging uses radiotracers that target specific molecules or processes. For example, [18F] fluorodeoxyglucose (FDG) is commonly used to assess glucose metabolism, as cancer cells exhibit increased glucose uptake. Other radiotracers target specific receptors, enzymes, or transporters, allowing the evaluation of various physiological and pathological processes.

PET imaging plays a role in both diagnosis and treatment planning. It aids in the identification and staging of diseases, such as cancer, by visualizing the extent and metabolic activity of tumors. PET scans can also guide treatment decisions by assessing treatment response and monitoring disease progression. Additionally, PET imaging is used to determine the suitability of patients for targeted therapies based on specific molecular characteristics, enabling personalized treatment approaches.

=== Single-photon emission computed tomography ===
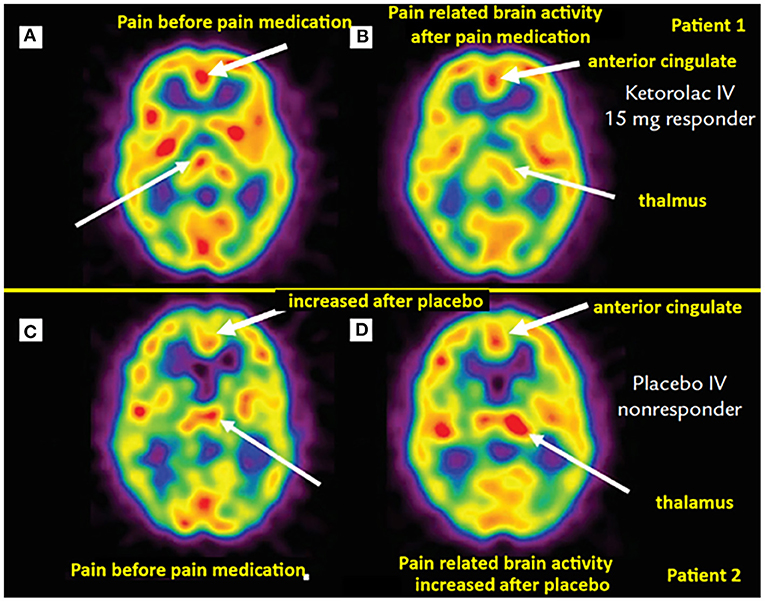
Brain perfusion SPECT shows dental pain patients with analgesia (top row) versus placebo (bottom row).

Single-photon emission computed tomography (SPECT) is employed in theranostics, using gamma rays emitted by a radiotracer to generate three-dimensional images of the body. SPECT imaging involves the injection of a radiotracer that emits single photons, which are detected by a gamma camera rotating around the person undergoing imaging.

SPECT provides functional and anatomical information, allowing the assessment of organ structure, blood flow, and specific molecular targets. It is useful in evaluating diseases that involve altered blood flow or specific receptor expression. For example, SPECT imaging with technetium-99m (Tc-99m) radiopharmaceuticals may be able to assess myocardial perfusion and identify areas of ischemia or infarction in patients with cardiovascular diseases.

SPECT imaging helps in identifying disease localization, staging, and assessing the response to therapy. Moreover, SPECT imaging is employed in targeted radionuclide therapy, where the same radiotracer used for diagnostic imaging can be used to deliver therapeutic doses of radiation to the diseased tissue.

=== Magnetic resonance imaging ===
Magnetic resonance imaging (MRI) is a non-invasive imaging technique that uses strong magnetic fields and radiofrequency pulses to generate detailed anatomical and functional images of the body. MRI provides excellent soft tissue contrast and is widely used in theranostics for its ability to visualize anatomical structures and assess physiological processes.

In theranostics, MRI allows for the detection and characterization of tumors, assessment of tumor extent, and evaluation of treatment response. MRI can provide information on tissue perfusion, diffusion, and metabolism, aiding in the selection of appropriate therapies and monitoring their effectiveness.

Advancements in MRI technology have expanded its capabilities in theranostics. Techniques such as functional MRI (fMRI) enable the assessment of brain activation and connectivity, while diffusion-weighted imaging (DWI) provides insights into tissue microstructure. The development of molecular imaging agents, such as superparamagnetic iron oxide nanoparticles, allows for targeted imaging and tracking of specific molecular entities.

== Therapeutic approaches ==
Theranostics encompasses a range of therapeutic approaches that are designed to target and treat diseases with enhanced precision.

=== Targeted drug delivery systems ===
Targeted drug delivery systems facilitate the selective delivery of therapeutic agents to specific disease sites while minimizing off-target effects. These systems employ strategies, such as nanoparticles, liposomes, and micelles, to encapsulate drugs and enhance their stability, solubility, and bioavailability. By incorporating diagnostic components, such as imaging agents or targeting ligands, into these delivery systems, clinicians can monitor drug distribution and accumulation in real-time, ensuring effective treatment and reducing systemic toxicity. Targeted drug delivery systems hold promise in the treatment of cancer, cardiovascular diseases, and other conditions, as they allow for personalized and site-specific therapy.

=== Gene therapy ===
Gene therapy is a therapeutic approach that involves modifying or replacing faulty genes to treat or prevent diseases. In theranostics, gene therapy can be combined with diagnostic imaging to monitor the delivery, expression, and activity of therapeutic genes. Imaging techniques such as MRI, PET, and optical imaging enable non-invasive assessment of gene transfer and expression, providing valuable insights into the efficacy and safety of gene-based treatments. Gene therapy has shown potential in treating genetic disorders, cancer, and cardiovascular diseases, and its integration with diagnostic imaging offers a comprehensive approach for monitoring and optimizing treatment outcomes.

=== Radiotherapy ===
Radiotherapy can be integrated with imaging techniques to guide treatment planning, monitor radiation dose distribution, and assess treatment response. Molecular imaging methods, such as PET and SPECT, can be employed to visualize and quantify tumor characteristics, such as hypoxia or receptor expression, aiding in personalized radiation dose optimization^{10}.

Additionally, theranostic approaches involving radiolabeled therapeutic agents, known as radiotheranostics, combine the therapeutic effects of radiation with diagnostic capabilities. Radiotheranostics, including Peptide receptor radionuclide therapy (PRRT), hold promise for targeted radiotherapy, enabling precise tumor targeting and dose escalation, while sparing healthy tissues. For example, PRRT based on Lutetium-177 combinations (known as radioligands) has emerged as a treatment option for inoperable metastatic neuroendocrine tumours (NET).

=== Immunotherapy ===
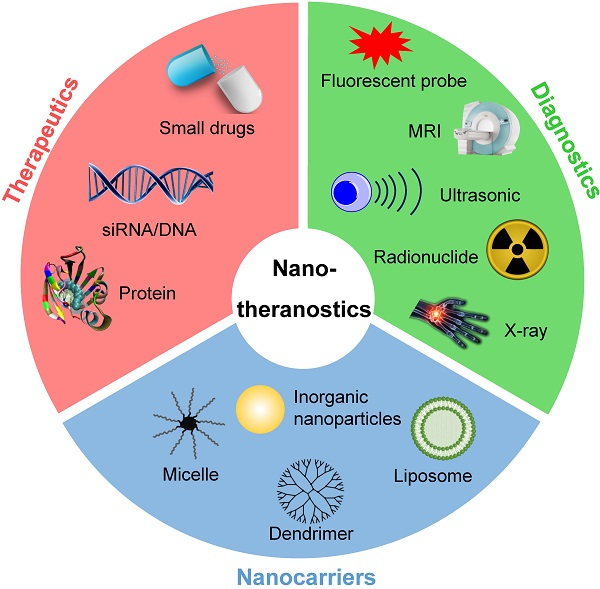
Nanotheranostics combines therapy and diagnosis in a single nanoplatform, enhancing treatment results in cancer and other diseases. Targeting nanotherapeutics improves delivery and effectiveness for diverse genetic and translational pathologies.

Immunotherapy harnesses the body's immune system to recognize and attack cancer cells or other disease targets. In theranostics, immunotherapeutic approaches can be coupled with diagnostic imaging to assess immune cell infiltration, tumor immunogenicity, and treatment response. Imaging techniques, such as PET and MRI, can provide valuable information about the tumor microenvironment, immune cell dynamics, and response to immunotherapies. Furthermore, theranostic strategies involving the use of radiolabeled immunotherapeutic agents allow for simultaneous imaging and therapy, aiding in patient selection, treatment monitoring, and optimization of immunotherapeutic regimens.

=== Nanomedicine (nanotheranostics) ===
Nanomedicine refers to the use of nanoscale materials for medical applications. In theranostics, nanomedicine offers opportunities for targeted drug delivery, imaging, and therapy. Nanoparticles can be engineered to carry therapeutic payloads, imaging agents, and targeting ligands, allowing for multimodal theranostic approaches. These nanocarriers can enhance drug stability, improve drug solubility, and enable controlled release at the disease site. Additionally, nanomaterials with inherent imaging properties, such as quantum dots or gold nanoparticles, can serve as contrast agents for imaging.

== Applications and challenges ==
=== Oncology ===
Theranostics has been applied in oncology, contributing to new approaches in the diagnosis, treatment, and monitoring of cancers. By integrating diagnostic imaging and targeted therapies, theranostics offers personalized approaches that improve treatment outcomes and patient care. In oncology, theranostics encompasses a wide range of applications, including the management of various types of cancers such as breast, lung, prostate, and colorectal cancer. Molecular imaging techniques, such as positron emission tomography (PET) and single-photon emission computed tomography (SPECT), enable the visualization and characterization of cancerous lesions, aiding in early detection, staging, and assessment of treatment response. This allows for more accurate and tailored treatment planning, including the selection of appropriate targeted therapies or the optimization of radiation therapy.

Despite the significant progress, the translation of theranostics into routine clinical practice faces challenges, including the need for standardized imaging protocols, biomarker validation, and regulatory considerations. Additionally, there is a continuous need for research and development to further enhance the effectiveness and accessibility of theranostic approaches in oncology.

=== Neurology and cardiology ===
Theranostics extends beyond oncology and holds potential in the fields of neurology and cardiology. In neurology, theranostic approaches offer new avenues for the diagnosis and treatment of various neurodegenerative diseases, such as Alzheimer's disease, Parkinson's disease, and multiple sclerosis. Advanced imaging techniques, including magnetic resonance imaging (MRI) and positron emission tomography (PET), allow for the visualization of neuroanatomy, functional connectivity, and molecular changes in the brain. This enables early detection, precise diagnosis, and monitoring of disease progression, facilitating the development of targeted therapeutic interventions.

Similarly, in cardiology, theranostics play a significant role in the diagnosis and treatment of cardiovascular conditions. Non-invasive imaging modalities like MRI and computed tomography (CT) provide detailed information about cardiac structure, function, and blood flow, aiding in the assessment of heart disease and the guidance of interventions. Theranostic approaches in cardiology involve targeted drug delivery systems for the treatment of conditions such as atherosclerosis and restenosis, as well as image-guided interventions for precise stenting or catheter-based therapies.

=== Research directions ===
Several challenges remain to be addressed for widespread adoption and integration of theranostics into routine clinical practice. Regulatory considerations will play a role in ensuring the safety, efficacy, and quality of theranostic agents and technologies. Harmonization of regulations across different countries and regions is necessary to facilitate global implementation. Cost-effectiveness is a significant challenge, as theranostic approaches can be expensive. Strategies to optimize resource utilization and reimbursement models have been discussed. Technical limitations, such as the development of more specific and sensitive imaging agents, improvement of imaging resolution and quality, and the integration of different imaging modalities, require ongoing research and technological advancements. Ethical considerations surrounding patient privacy, data security, and the responsible use of patient information need to be addressed.
