= Leioproctus murinus =

Scientific classification
- Kingdom: Animalia
- Phylum: Arthropoda
- Clade: Pancrustacea
- Class: Insecta
- Order: Hymenoptera
- Family: Colletidae
- Genus: Leioproctus
- Species: L. murinus

Binomial name
- Leioproctus murinus Batley, 2025

Species of bee

Leioproctus murinus, or Leioproctus (Euryglossidia) murinus, is a species of bee in the family Colletidae and subfamily Colletinae. It is endemic to Australia. It was described by entomologist Michael Batley in 2025.

== Etymology ==
The specific epithet murinus (Latin: "mouse-coloured") refers to both appearance and relatively small size.

== Description ==
The female body length is 5 mm, the male 4.4 mm. Integumental colouration is mainly black, with a dark brown metasoma. The hair is white to grey and brown.

== Distribution and habitat ==
The species occurs in inland eastern Australia. The type locality is 56 km east of Cunnamulla in southern Queensland.

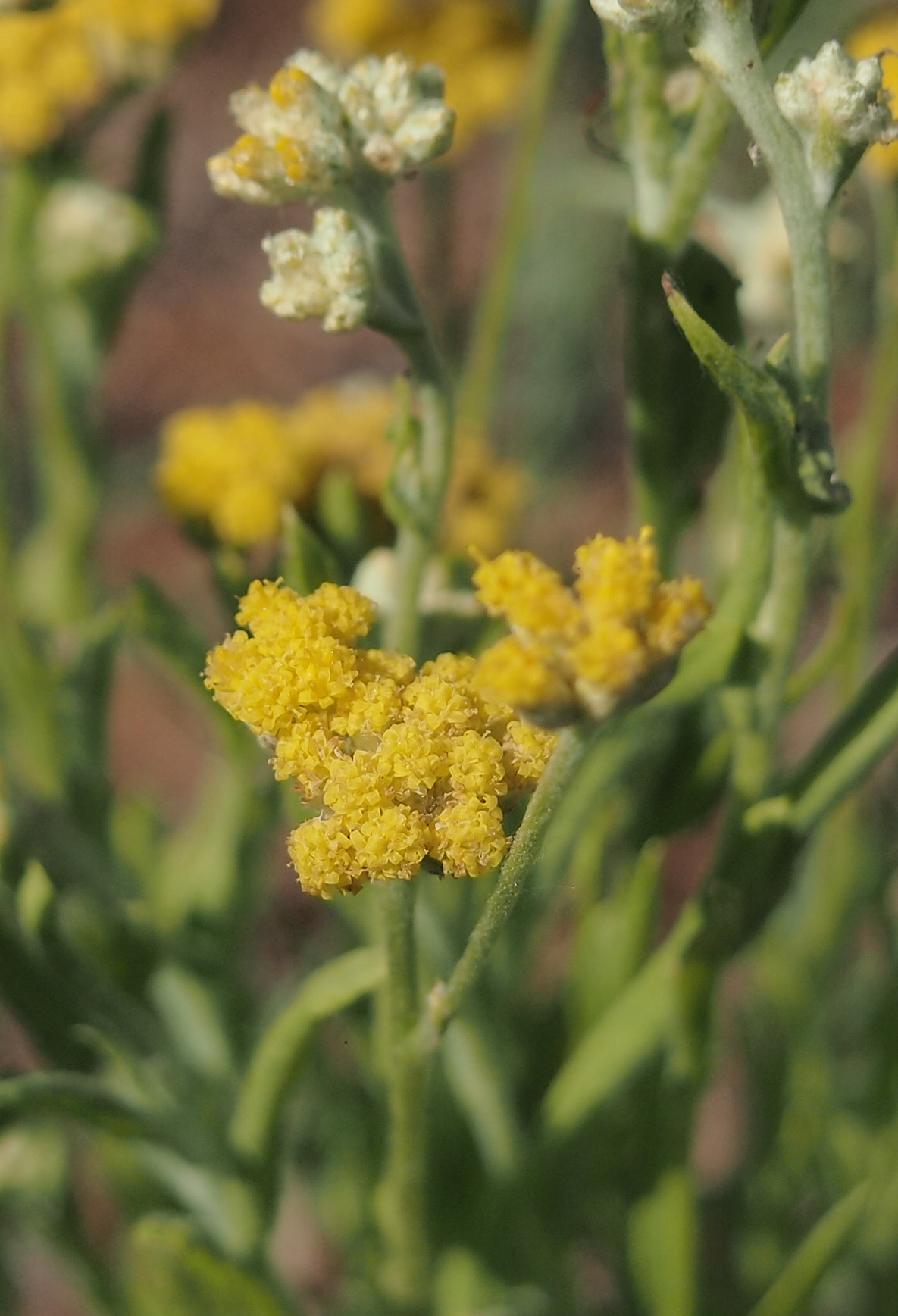
Rhodanthe moschata, a forage plant of the bees

== Behaviour ==
The adults are flying mellivores. Flowering plants visited by the bees include Parakeelya balonensis, Calotis cuneifolia, Calotis lappulacea and Rhodanthe moschata.

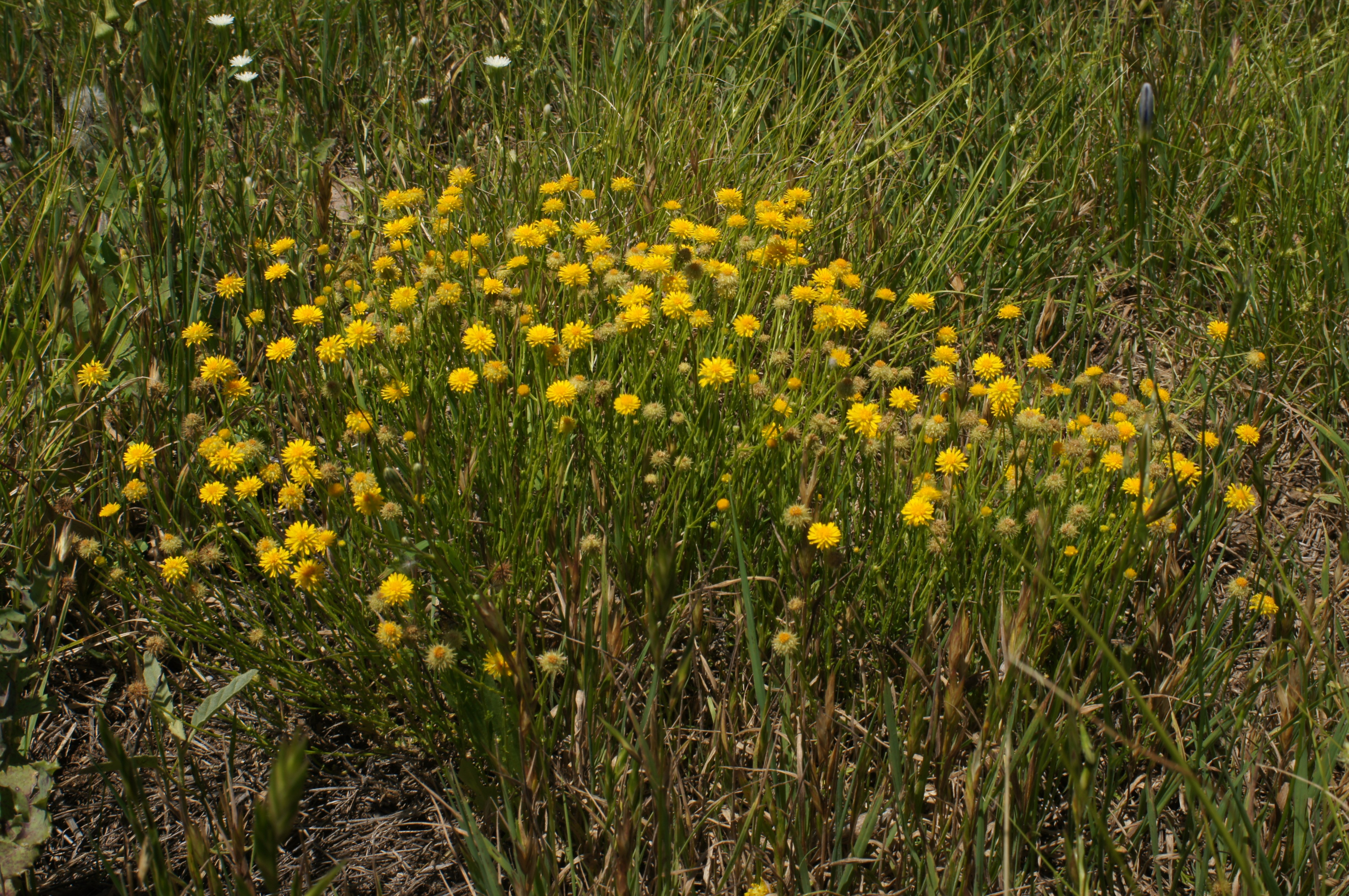
Calotis lappulacea (yellow burr-daisy), a forage plant of the bees
