= Dusty daisy-bush =

Dusty daisy-bush is the common name for two different species of Olearia:

- Olearia brevipedunculata N.G.Walsh
- Olearia phlogopappa (Labill.) DC.
