= Pomaderris graniticola =

Scientific classification
- Kingdom: Plantae
- Clade: Tracheophytes
- Clade: Angiosperms
- Clade: Eudicots
- Clade: Rosids
- Order: Rosales
- Family: Rhamnaceae
- Genus: Pomaderris
- Species: P. graniticola

Binomial name
- Pomaderris graniticola (N.G.Walsh & Coates) K.L.Mcdougall & Millott

Synonyms
- Pomaderris argyrophylla subsp. graniticola N.G.Walsh & Coates

Species of shrub

Pomaderris graniticola is a species of flowering plant in the family Rhamnaceae and is endemic to eastern Australia. It is a shrub or small tree with hairy young stems, lance-shaped to elliptic leaves, and sparse panicles of yellow, white or cream-coloured flowers.

== Description ==
Pomaderris graniticola is a shrub or small tree that typically grows to a height of 1–6 m (3 ft 3 in – 19 ft 8 in), its new growth and young stems covered with copper-coloured hairs. The leaves are lance-shaped to elliptic, 15–65 mm (0.59–2.56 in) long and 15–30 mm (0.59–1.18 in) wide on a petiole 4–10 mm (0.16–0.39 in) long with egg-shaped stipules 3–5 mm (0.12–0.20 in) long at the base, but that fall off as the leaf develops. The upper surface of the leaves is glabrous and the lower surface has greyish white hairs pressed against the surface. The flowers are borne in pyramid-shaped panicles 20–80 mm (0.79–3.15 in) long with up to 100 yellow, white or cream-coloured flowers, each on a pedicel 1.5–3.5 mm (0.059–0.138 in) long. The sepals are 2.0–2.5 mm (0.079–0.098 in) long with silvery simple star-shaped hairs, and the petals are about 1.5 mm (0.059 in) long. Flowering occurs in September and October.

== Taxonomy ==
This pomaderris was first formally described in 1997 by Neville Grant Walsh and F. Coates who gave it the name Pomaderris argyrophylla subsp. graniticola in the journal Muelleria from specimens Walsh collected in Girraween National Park in 1994. In 2005, Keith Leonard McDougall and Jacqueline C. Millott raised the subspecies to species status as Pomaderris graniticola in the journal Telopea. The specific epithet (graniticola) means "granite dweller".

== Distribution and habitat ==
This pomaderris grows in open forest and scrub near watercourses and is widespread on the granite belt from Stanthorpe and the southern Darling Downs of south-eastern Queensland to the Gibraltar Range and New England regions of New South Wales.
