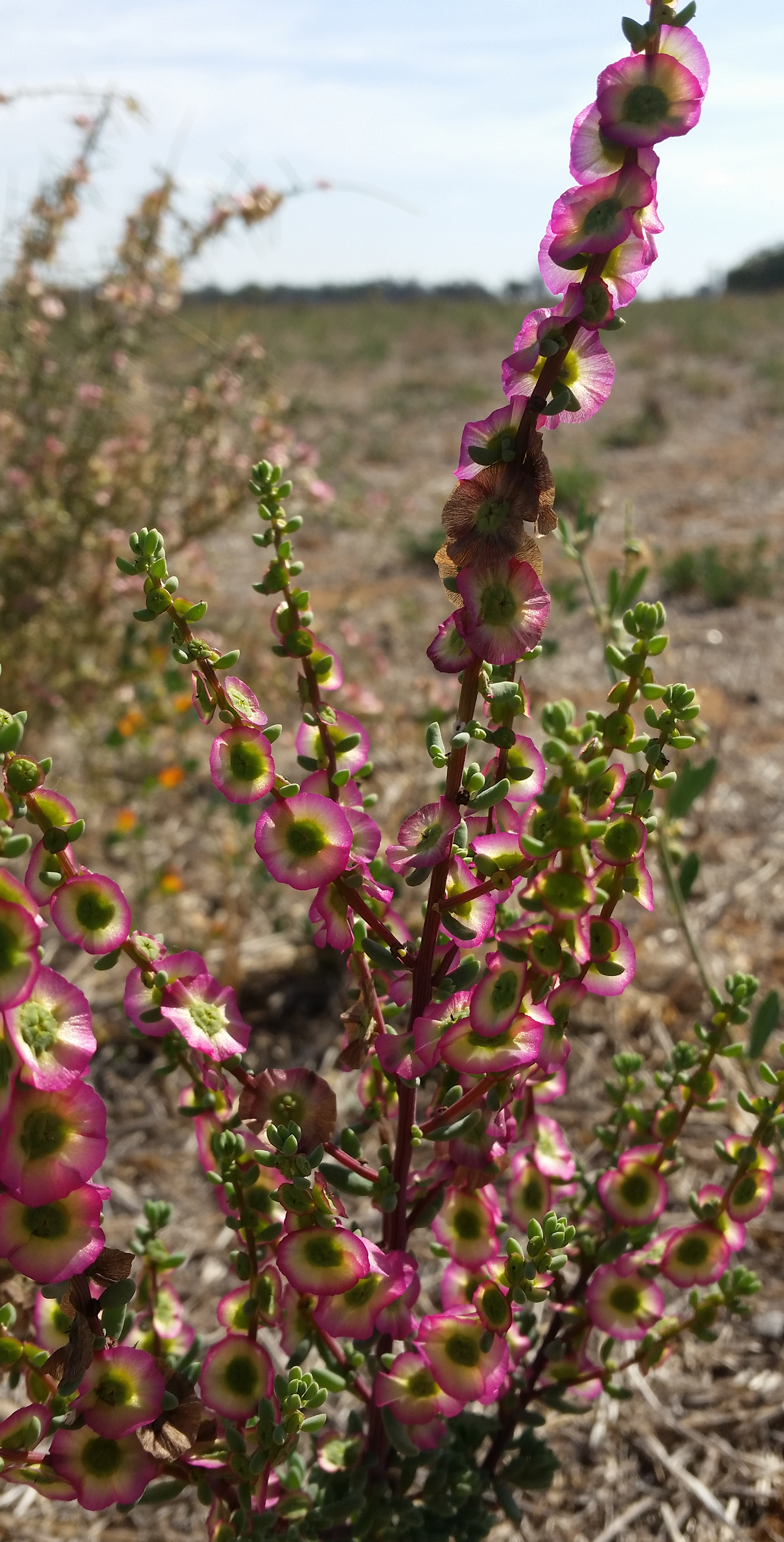

Scientific classification
- Kingdom: Plantae
- Clade: Tracheophytes
- Clade: Angiosperms
- Clade: Eudicots
- Order: Caryophyllales
- Family: Amaranthaceae
- Genus: Maireana
- Species: M. obrienii

Binomial name
- Maireana obrienii N.G.Walsh

Synonyms
- Maireana sp. (Tara T.J.McDonald 76)

= Maireana obrienii =

Species of shrub

Maireana obrienii is a species of flowering plant in the family Amaranthaceae and is endemic to eastern Australia. It is an erect shrub with mostly glabrous branchlets, fleshy, narrowly oval to club-shaped leaves, bisexual flowers and a fruiting perianth with a flat wing with a pink margin.

== Description ==
Maireana obrienii is an erect shrub that typically grows to a height of up to 80 cm (31 in) and has glabrous branchlets, except for tufts of hairs in leaf axils. The leaves are arranged alternately and fleshy, narrowly oval to club-shaped, mostly 3–6 mm (0.12–0.24 in) long and glabrous. The flowers are bisexual, the fruiting perianth 10–13 mm (0.39–0.51 in) in diameter with a thin-walled, shallowly hemispherical tube 3.5–4.5 mm (0.14–0.18 in) high in diameter with a more or less flat wing with a rosy-pink margin and a radial slit.

== Taxonomy ==
Maireana obrienii was first formally described in 2013 by Neville Walsh in the journal Muelleria. The specific epithet (obrienii) honours "Mr Eris O'Brien, farmer and naturalist, whose extensive knowledge of the vegetation of the Riverina has resulted in many new discoveries".

== Distribution and habitat ==
This species of bluebush grows in grassland and open woodland, and occurs in southern Queensland and in an arc from near Jerilderie in New South Wales and west to Serpentine and between Inglewood, Echuca and Bendigo in Victoria.
