= Acacia ureniae =

Scientific classification
- Kingdom: Plantae
- Clade: Tracheophytes
- Clade: Angiosperms
- Clade: Eudicots
- Clade: Rosids
- Order: Fabales
- Family: Fabaceae
- Subfamily: Caesalpinioideae
- Clade: Mimosoid clade
- Genus: Acacia
- Species: A. ureniae

Binomial name
- Acacia ureniae N.G.Walsh

Species of legume

Acacia ureniae is a shrub of the genus Acacia that is native to Victoria.

== See also ==
- List of Acacia species
