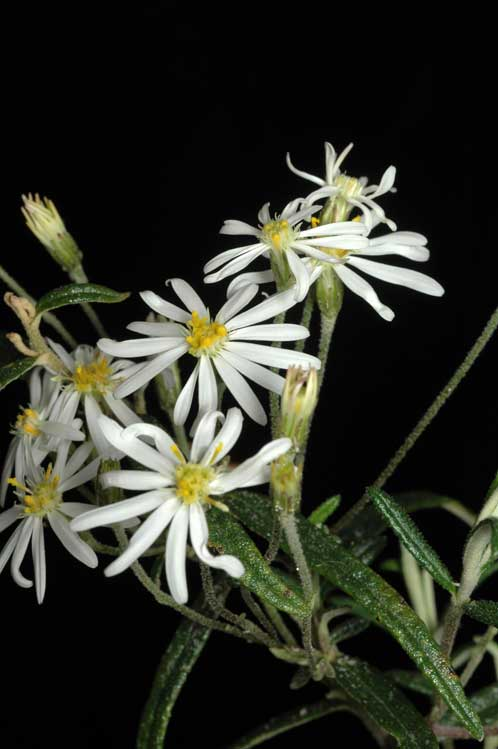
- In the Australian National Botanic Gardens

Scientific classification
- Kingdom: Plantae
- Clade: Tracheophytes
- Clade: Angiosperms
- Clade: Eudicots
- Clade: Asterids
- Order: Asterales
- Family: Asteraceae
- Genus: Olearia
- Species: O. stenophylla

Binomial name
- Olearia stenophylla N.G.Walsh

= Olearia stenophylla =

Species of plant

Olearia stenophylla is a species of flowering plant in the family Asteraceae and is endemic to New South Wales. It is a shrub with oblong to linear leaves, and white and yellow, daisy-like inflorescences.

== Description ==
Olearia stenophylla is a shrub that typically grows to a height of up to 1.2 m (3 ft 11 in), usually with many stems at the base, and leafless in the lower half. Its young stems, the lower surface of the leaves and the peduncles are covered with loose, woolly, star-shaped hairs. The leaves are oblong to linear, 40–80 mm (1.6–3.1 in) long, 1–5 mm (0.039–0.197 in) wide and sessile with the edges turned down or rolled under. The heads or daisy-like "flowers" are arranged in corymbs on the ends of branches on a peduncle 10–30 mm (0.39–1.18 in) long, the involucral bracts 3.5–4.0 mm (0.14–0.16 in) long. There are 9 to 14 usually white ray florets, surrounding a similar number of yellow disc florets, the ligule 4–6 mm (0.16–0.24 in) long. Flowering occurs from late November to mid-December and the fruit is a flattened, cylindrical achene, the pappus with 30 to 40 bristles 3–4 mm (0.12–0.16 in) long.

== Taxonomy ==
Olearia stenophylla was first formally described in 2000 by Neville Grant Walsh in the journal Muelleria from specimens collected in Kosciuszko National Park in 1998. The specific epithet (stenophylla) means "narrow-leaved".

== Distribution and habitat ==
This olearia is grows in snow gum woodland at altitudes between 1,200 and 1,400 m (3,900 and 4,600 ft) in the catchment of the Tumut River in Kosciuszko National Park, New South Wales.
