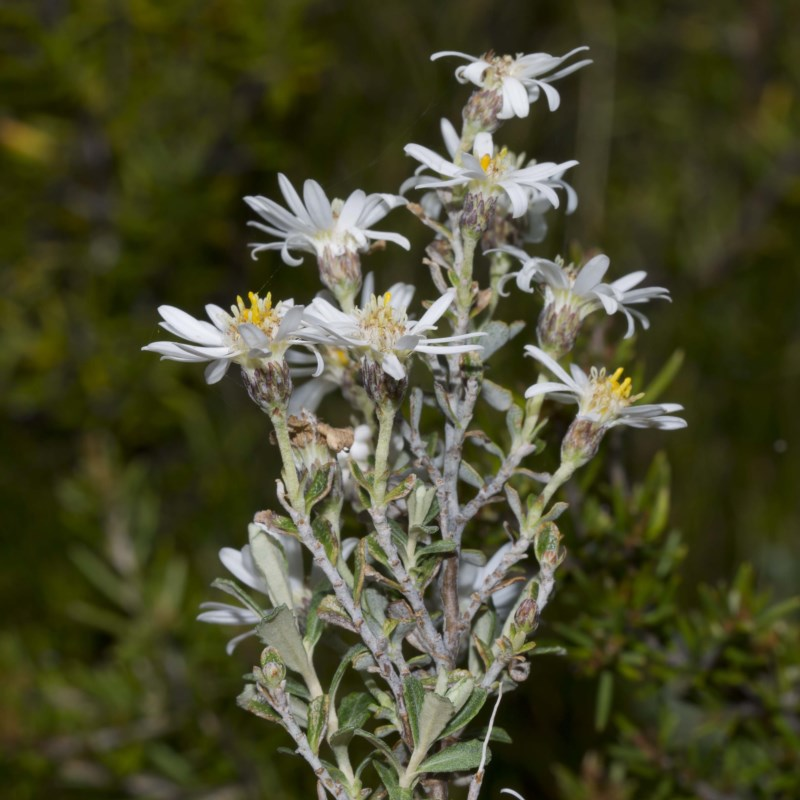
- Olearia brevipedunculata in Kosciuszko National Park

Scientific classification
- Kingdom: Plantae
- Clade: Tracheophytes
- Clade: Angiosperms
- Clade: Eudicots
- Clade: Asterids
- Order: Asterales
- Family: Asteraceae
- Genus: Olearia
- Species: O. brevipedunculata

Binomial name
- Olearia brevipedunculata N.G.Walsh

= Olearia brevipedunculata =

Dusty daisy-bush

Species of shrub

Olearia brevipedunculata, commonly known as the dusty daisy-bush (although this name may also refer to O. phlogopappa), is a small shrub with whitish-grey foliage and white daisy-like flowers in summer. Mostly found in Victoria and scattered locations in New South Wales, Australia.

== Description ==
Olearia brevipedunuculata is a small upright shrub to about 1 m (3.3 ft) high. The branchlets are covered in grey-whitish thickly matted small star shaped hairs. The leaves grow alternately are sessile or with an obscure stalk. The leaves may be egg-shaped, oval or oblong 5–16.5 mm (0.20–0.65 in) long and 2–6.5 mm (0.079–0.26 in) wide. The upper leaf surface is greyish with dense sparsely scattered star-shaped hairs. The leaf underside is grey-whitish, occasionally yellowish and covered in densely matted star-shaped hairs obscuring the leaf veins. The leaf margin is entire or with an irregular scalloped edge. The inflorescence is a cluster of 12-22 daisy-like flowers 15–22 mm (0.59–0.87 in) in diameter in a single spray at the apex of branchlets on a short stem. The overlapping bracts are in rows of 3 or 4, are more or less hemispherical 4–7 mm (0.16–0.28 in) long with fine silky hairs. The white flower petals are 5–10 mm (0.20–0.39 in) long. The flower centre is yellow. The fruit is a flattened cylindrical shape with obscure ribbing, 2–3 mm (0.079–0.12 in) long with flattened silky hairs, occasionally glandular. Flowering occurs from December to January.

== Taxonomy and naming ==
Olearia brevipedunculata was first formally described by N.G. Walsh in 2004 and the description published in Muelleria. The specific epithet (brevipedunculata) is derived from the Latin words brevis meaning "short" and pedunculus meaning "small, slender stalk".

== Distribution and habitat ==
The dusty daisy-bush is found in alpine, heath and shrubland areas of the Bogong High Plains and higher locations from Mount Buffalo and near Mount Kent in Victoria. It is also found in scattered locations in New South Wales.
