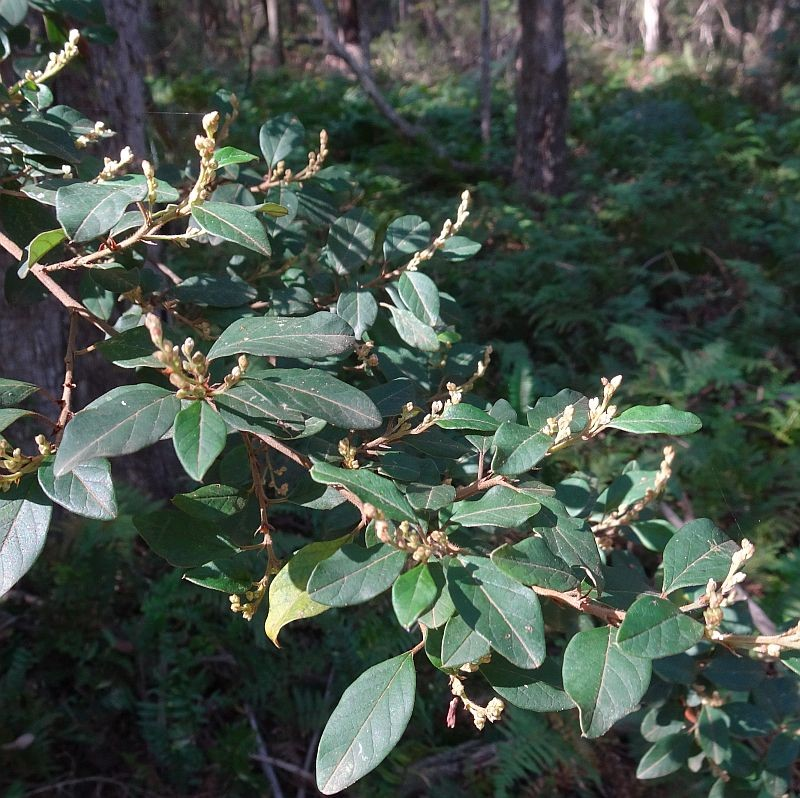
- In Bodalla State Forest

Scientific classification
- Kingdom: Plantae
- Clade: Tracheophytes
- Clade: Angiosperms
- Clade: Eudicots
- Clade: Rosids
- Order: Rosales
- Family: Rhamnaceae
- Genus: Pomaderris
- Species: P. bodalla

Binomial name
- Pomaderris bodalla N.G.Walsh & Coates

= Pomaderris bodalla =

Bodalla pomaderris

Species of shrub

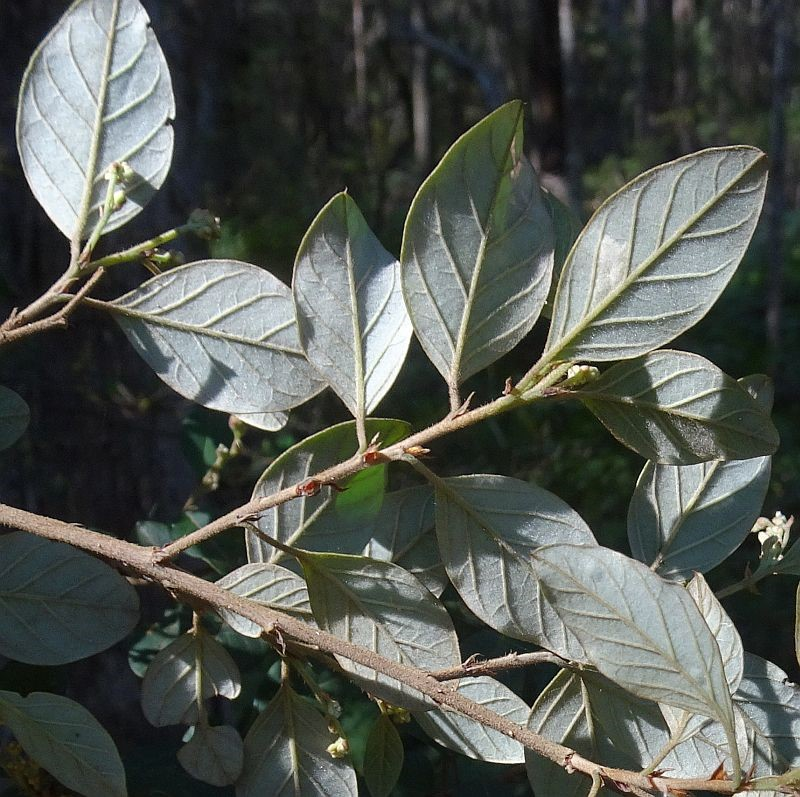
Lower leaf surface

Pomaderris bodalla, commonly known as Bodalla pomaderris, is a species of flowering plant in the family Rhamnaceae and is endemic to New South Wales. It is a shrub with hairy young stems, elliptic to more or less rhombic leaves, and dense clusters of cream-coloured flowers.

== Description ==
Pomaderris bodalla is a shrub that typically grows to a height of 2–4 m (6 ft 7 in – 13 ft 1 in), its young stems covered with simple rust-coloured, and star-shaped, greyish hairs. The leaves are elliptic to more or less rhombic, mostly 20–30 mm (0.79–1.18 in) long and 12–15 mm (0.47–0.59 in) wide, the upper surface dark green and glabrous and the lower surface with star-shaped, greyish hairs. The flowers are borne in dense panicles 20–80 mm (0.79–3.15 in) long on the ends of branchlets and are cream-coloured and densely hairy, each flower on a pedicel 1–2 mm (0.039–0.079 in) long. The floral cup is 0.8–1.2 mm (0.031–0.047 in) in diameter, the sepals are 1.5–1.7 mm (0.059–0.067 in) long but fall off as the flowers open and there are no petals. Flowering has been observed in October.

== Taxonomy ==
Pomaderris bodalla was first formally described in 1997 by Neville Grant Walsh and Fiona Coates and the description was published in the journal Muelleria from specimens collected by Walsh near Tilba Tilba in 1995.

== Distribution and habitat ==
Bodalla pomaderris grows in moist open forest near streams and in sheltered gullies between Bodalla and Merimbula on the south coast, and in open forest and woodland near Muswellbrook in the upper Hunter Valley in New South Wales.

== Conservation status ==
This pomaderris is listed as "vulnerable" under the New South Wales Government Biodiversity Conservation Act 2016.
