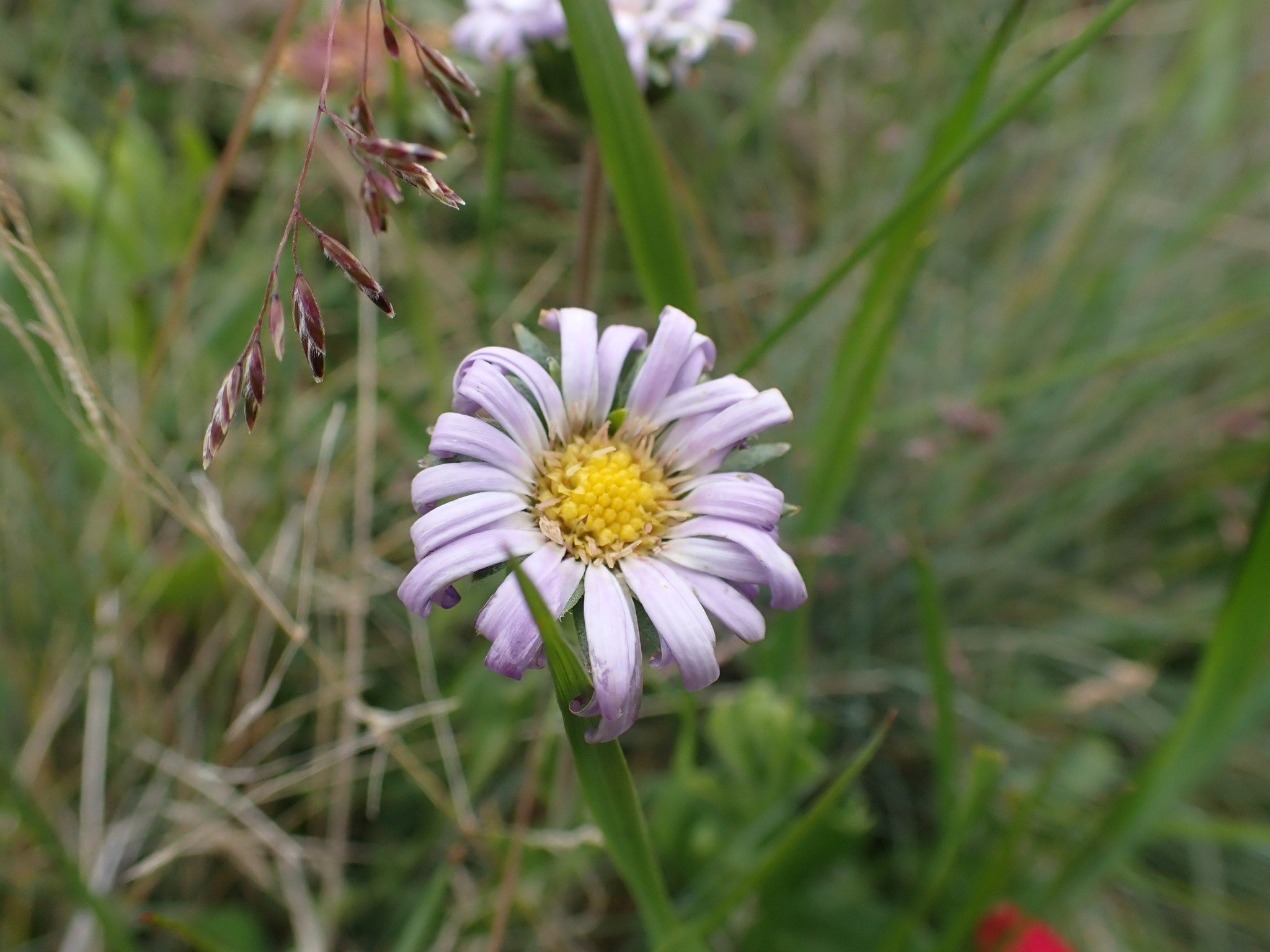

Scientific classification
- Kingdom: Plantae
- Clade: Tracheophytes
- Clade: Angiosperms
- Clade: Eudicots
- Clade: Asterids
- Order: Asterales
- Family: Asteraceae
- Genus: Calotis
- Species: C. pubescens

Binomial name
- Calotis pubescens (F.Muell. ex Benth.) N.G.Walsh & K.L.McDougall

Synonyms
- Calotis cuneata var. pubescens (Benth.) G.L.Davis; Calotis scabiosifolia var. pubescens Benth.

= Calotis pubescens =

Species of flowering plant

Calotis pubescens is a species of daisy endemic to Australia and found in New South Wales and Victoria.

It was first described in 1867 by Ferdinand von Mueller as Calotis scabiosifolia var. pubescens, but was raised to species rank in 2002 by Neville Walsh and Keith McDougall to become Calotis pubescens.
