= Cassinia rugata =

Conservation status
- Vulnerable (EPBC Act)

Scientific classification
- Kingdom: Plantae
- Clade: Tracheophytes
- Clade: Angiosperms
- Clade: Eudicots
- Clade: Asterids
- Order: Asterales
- Family: Asteraceae
- Genus: Cassinia
- Species: C. rugata

Binomial name
- Cassinia rugata N.G.Walsh

Species of flowering plant

Cassinia rugata, commonly known as wrinkled dollybush, or wrinkled cassinia, is a species of flowering plant in the family Asteraceae and is endemic to south-eastern Australia. It is a spreading to erect shrub with hairy, slightly sticky branchlets, oblong to narrow elliptic leaves and corymbs of up to three hundred flower heads.

== Description ==
Cassinia rugata is a spreading to erect shrub that typically grows to a height of up to 3 m (9.8 ft) with its branchlets densely covered with cottony white hairs. The leaves are oblong to narrow elliptic, 8–25 mm (0.31–0.98 in) long and about 1.5–4.5 mm (0.059–0.177 in) wide on a petiole about 0.5 mm (0.020 in) long. The upper surface of the leaves is scaly or pimply, the edges rolled under and the lower surface densely covered with cottony hairs. The flower heads are white, 4–5 mm (0.16–0.20 in) long and 1.5–2.5 mm (0.059–0.098 in) wide, each with four to seven florets surrounded by sixteen to eighteen overlapping involucral bracts. Between 20 and 300 heads are arranged in corymbs 30–120 mm (1.2–4.7 in) in diameter. Flowering occurs from February to April and the achenes are about 1.0 mm (0.039 in) long with a pappus of 24 to 28 bristles 2–3 mm (0.079–0.118 in) long.

== Taxonomy and naming ==
Cassinia rugata was first formally described in 1990 by Neville Grant Walsh in the journal Muelleria from specimens collected near Heathmere in 1988. The specific epithet (rugata) means "folded or wrinkled", referring to the inner involucral bracts.

== Distribution ==
Cassinia rugata grows in swamps and on the edge of rivers in south-eastern South Australia, south-western Victoria and northern Tasmania. The species was only recognised as occurring in Tasmania in 2010, and is only reliably known from two private properties in that state.

== Conservation status ==
This cassinia is listed as "vulnerable" under the Australian Government Environment Protection and Biodiversity Conservation Act 1999 and the Victorian Government Flora and Fauna Guarantee Act 1988 and as "endangered" under the Tasmanian Government Threatened Species Protection Act 1995.
