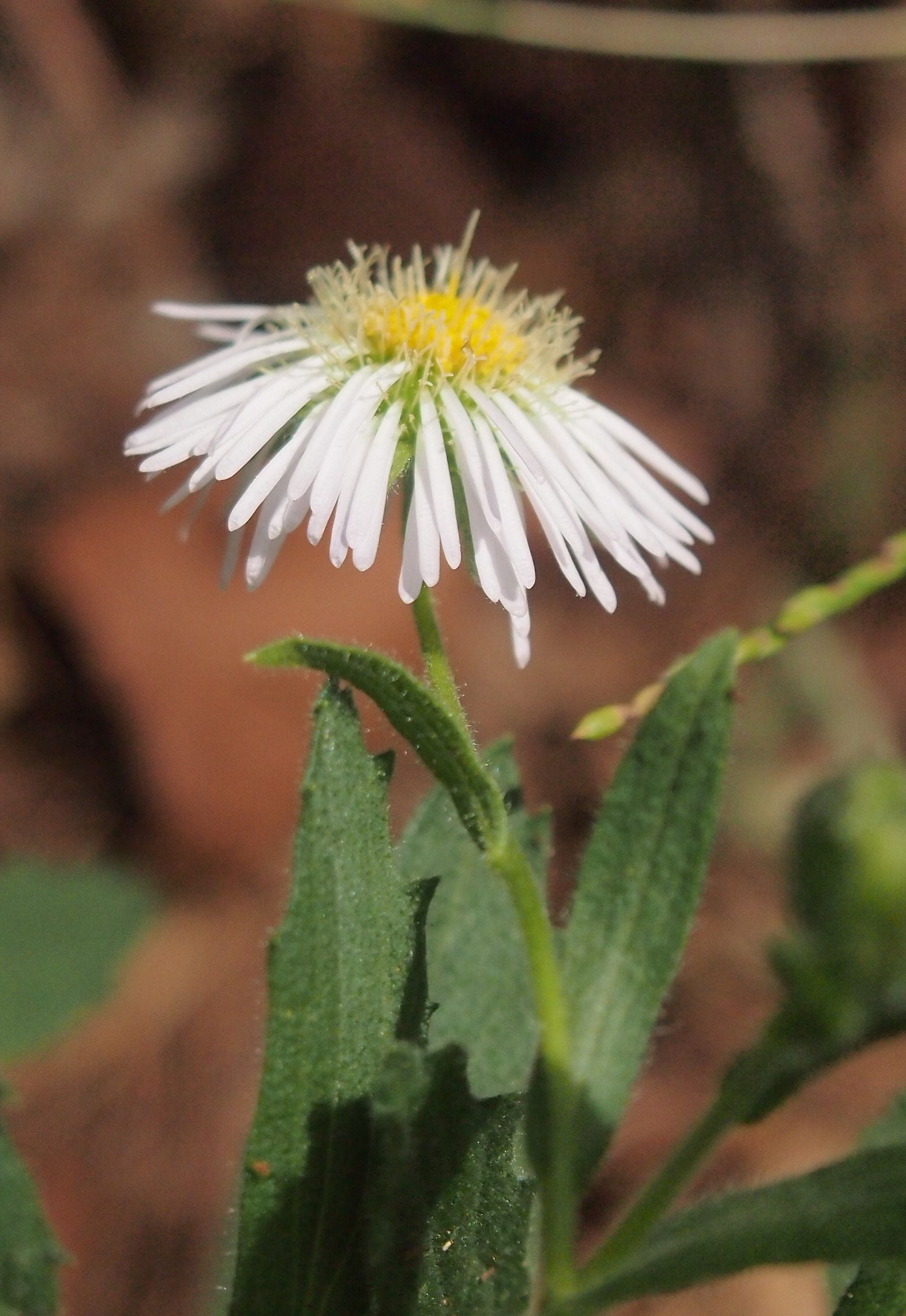

Scientific classification
- Kingdom: Plantae
- Clade: Tracheophytes
- Clade: Angiosperms
- Clade: Eudicots
- Clade: Asterids
- Order: Asterales
- Family: Asteraceae
- Genus: Calotis
- Species: C. dentex

Binomial name
- Calotis dentex R.Br.

= Calotis dentex =

White burr-daisy

Species of flowering plant

Calotis dentex commonly known as white burr-daisy, is a flowering plant in the family Asteraceae. It is a small shrub with white daisy like flowers and grows in New South Wales and Queensland.

== Description ==
Calotis dentex is an upright, perennial, multi-branched, understory shrub to 80 cm (31 in) high with smooth or slightly hairy, brown stems. The cauline leaves are lance to oblong-shaped, 2–9 cm (0.79–3.54 in) long, 4–11 mm (0.16–0.43 in) wide, margins variable, lobed, toothed, sometimes entire, sessile and with occasional hairs. The white, occasionally mauve flowers are borne on stalks up to 5 cm (2.0 in) long, 7–13 mm (0.28–0.51 in) in diameter, either singly or in a loose cyme from leaf axils and a yellow central disc 5–10 mm (0.20–0.39 in) in diameter. Flowering occurs from October to April and the fruit is a flattened, reddish brown cypsela with several spines 4–6 mm (0.16–0.24 in) long.

== Taxonomy and naming ==
Calotis dentex was first formally described in 1820 by Robert Brown and the description was published in Consisting of Coloured Figures of Exotic Plants, Cultivated in British Gardens; with their History and Mode of Treatmentand the type specimen was collected at Sydney by Robert Brown. The specific epithet "dentex" refers to the toothed edges of the leaves.

== Distribution and habitat ==
White burr-daisy grows mostly on clay soils in grasslands and open forests in New South Wales and Queensland.
