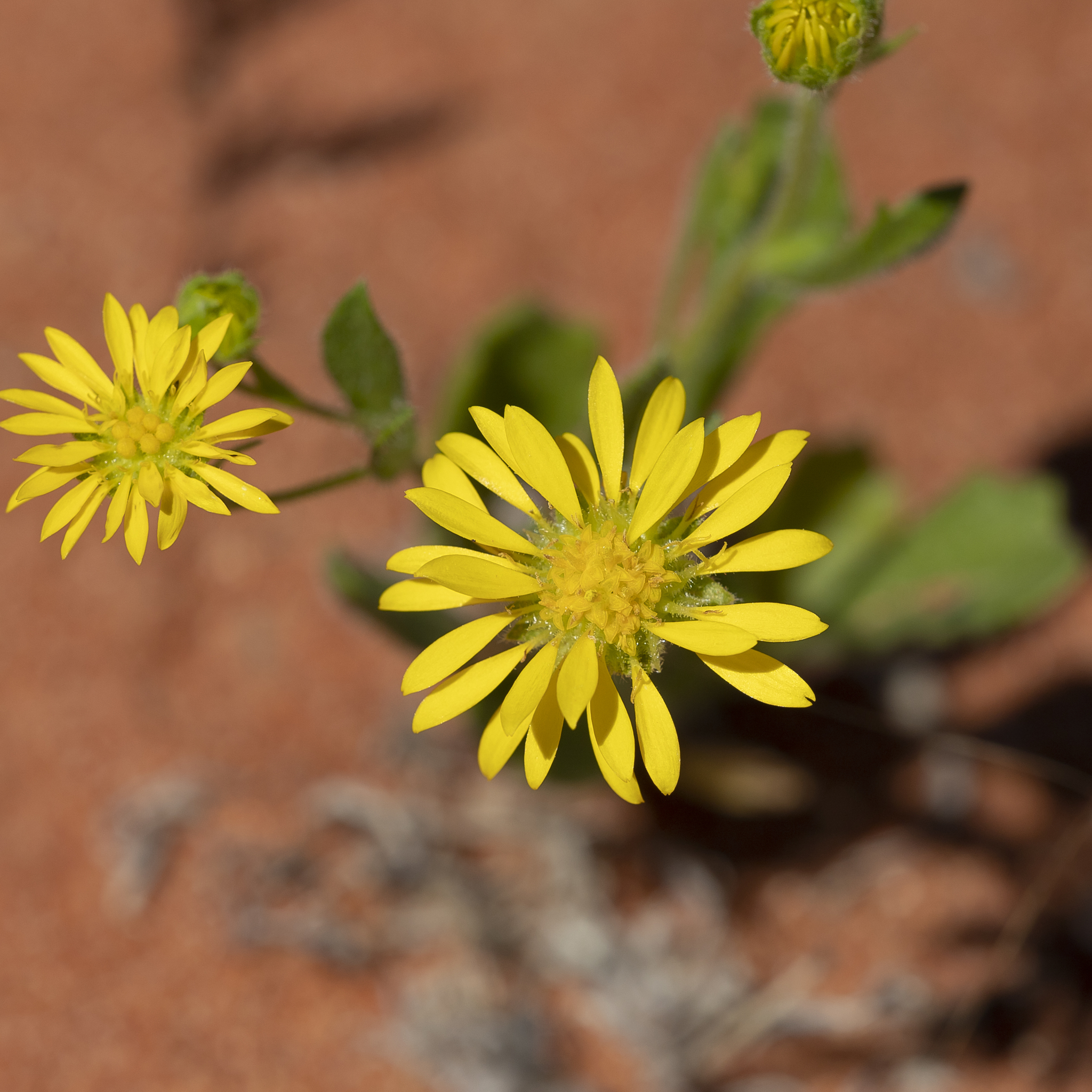

Scientific classification
- Kingdom: Plantae
- Clade: Tracheophytes
- Clade: Angiosperms
- Clade: Eudicots
- Clade: Asterids
- Order: Asterales
- Family: Asteraceae
- Genus: Calotis
- Species: C. cymbacantha

Binomial name
- Calotis cymbacantha F.Muell.

= Calotis cymbacantha =

Showy burr daisy

Species of flowering plant

Calotis cymbacantha, the showy burr daisy, is a species of Calotis native to the arid areas of Australia. It is a perennial herb that grows between 10 and 40 cm tall. It has hairy erect stems which are woody at the base and produces yellow flowers (Seeds of South Australia, 2018) (Victoria Flora, 2018).

== Description ==
Petals: Bright yellow petals, with 18-30 per flower head being 5 mm long and 1.5 mm wide. The flowers have a yellow centre borne on leafy slender stalks (Cunningham et al. 1992). Leaves: Oblong leaves that are between 10 and 65 mm long and 7–15 mm in width. Seeds: Obovate, flat and warty on each face, 2–3 mm long. They are boat-shaped towards the base. Flowers: August- October. (Seeds of South Australia, 2018), (Cunningham et al. 1992).

== History ==
The species was first described by Ferdinand von Mueller. He was a botanist that was appointed chief botanist for the colony of Victoria in 1853. He discovered many Australian plants, including the showy burr daisy (Morris, 1974).

== Distribution ==
Found in areas of sandy plains and arid areas (Cunningham et al., 1992)(Seeds of Australia, 2018). It is found mostly within the west of New South Wales, although it is distributed also to the south of Victoria and South Australia (Cunningham et al. 1992).

It lives within sparse mulga, black blue bush and other shrub communities within the sandplains and dune fields (Cunningham et al. 1992).

== Name meaning ==
The genus name, Calotis, comes from the Greek word kalos meaning beautiful. The specific name, cymbacantha, comes from the Greek word kymbe meaning boat and akantha meaning thorn and spine which refers to the boat-shaped shape of the seed (Morris, 1974),(Seeds of South Australia. 2018).
