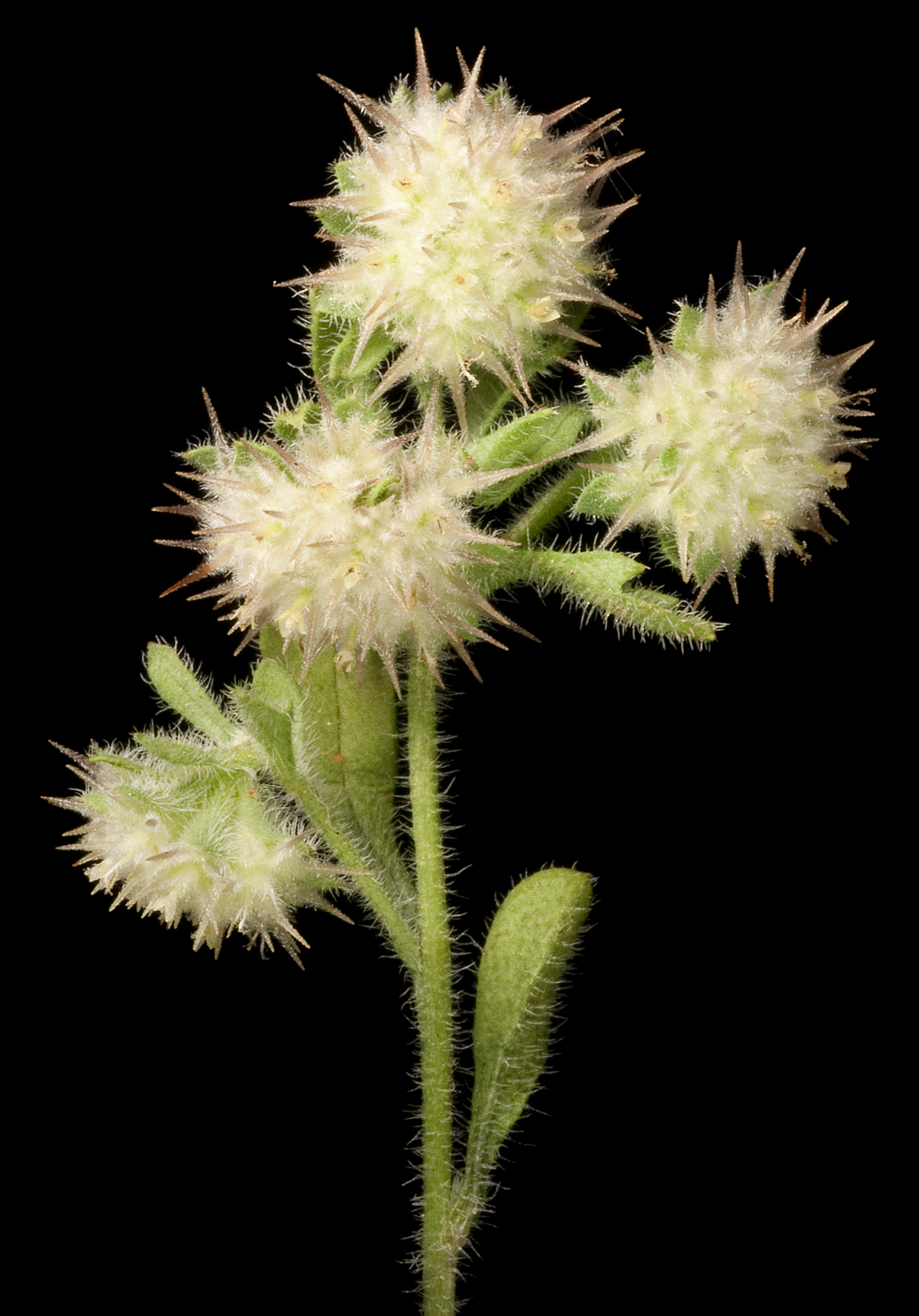

Scientific classification
- Kingdom: Plantae
- Clade: Tracheophytes
- Clade: Angiosperms
- Clade: Eudicots
- Clade: Asterids
- Order: Asterales
- Family: Asteraceae
- Genus: Calotis
- Species: C. hispidula

Binomial name
- Calotis hispidula F.Muell.

Synonyms
- Cheiroloma hispidulum

= Calotis hispidula =

Bogan flea

Species of flowering plant

Calotis hispidula, commonly known as the Bogan flea or bindi eye, is a hairy species of daisy found in many parts of mainland Australia. It is a small herbaceous plant growing up to 10 centimetres tall, with white flowers that are often seen in the winter months. The specific epithet hispidula refers to the plant's covering of stiff hairs.

Calotis spp. are daisies until they fruit, when the flower heads develop into masses of rigid needle-sharp barbs. Mainly opportunistic inhabitants of grasslands, their barbed burrs can be easily transported by livestock.

== Description ==
Calotis hispidula is an annual ascending herb which may grow to 10 to 12 centimetres (3.9 to 4.7 in) high, with rough, hirsute hairs.

It has no basal leaves; the aerial leaves are somewhat wedge-shaped, 0.5 to 2 centimetres (0.20 to 0.79 in) long and 1 to 7 millimetres (0.039 to 0.276 in) wide. The barbed flower heads range from 4 to 10 millimetres (0.16 to 0.39 in) in diameter, supported by bracts that encase a conical, scaled receptacle. The florets are yellow and sprout to be 1 mm long.

== Ecology ==
The species grows in sandy soil on flats, low dunes and small hills and appears to be associated with Acacia woodlands and shrublands dominated by chenopods.

Apparently a perennial that flowers in the first year of growth; no plants of this species have been observed to survive for more than two years; flowering is recorded for September and fruit have been collected in October, though it will flower as early as August.

=== Case study ===
At Mount Mulyah, northwest of Louth, New South Wales, Calotis spp. grows in an area cleared of original acacia cambagei woodland and subsequently invaded by dodonaea viscosa subsp. angustissima, which repressed the growth of herbaceous species. No regeneration of this species has been seen at Mount Mulyah since 1984. Calotis hispidula can often be found growing in conjunction with other Calotis species, such as C. cymbacantha and C. erinacea, and are very similar morphologically.

== Distribution ==
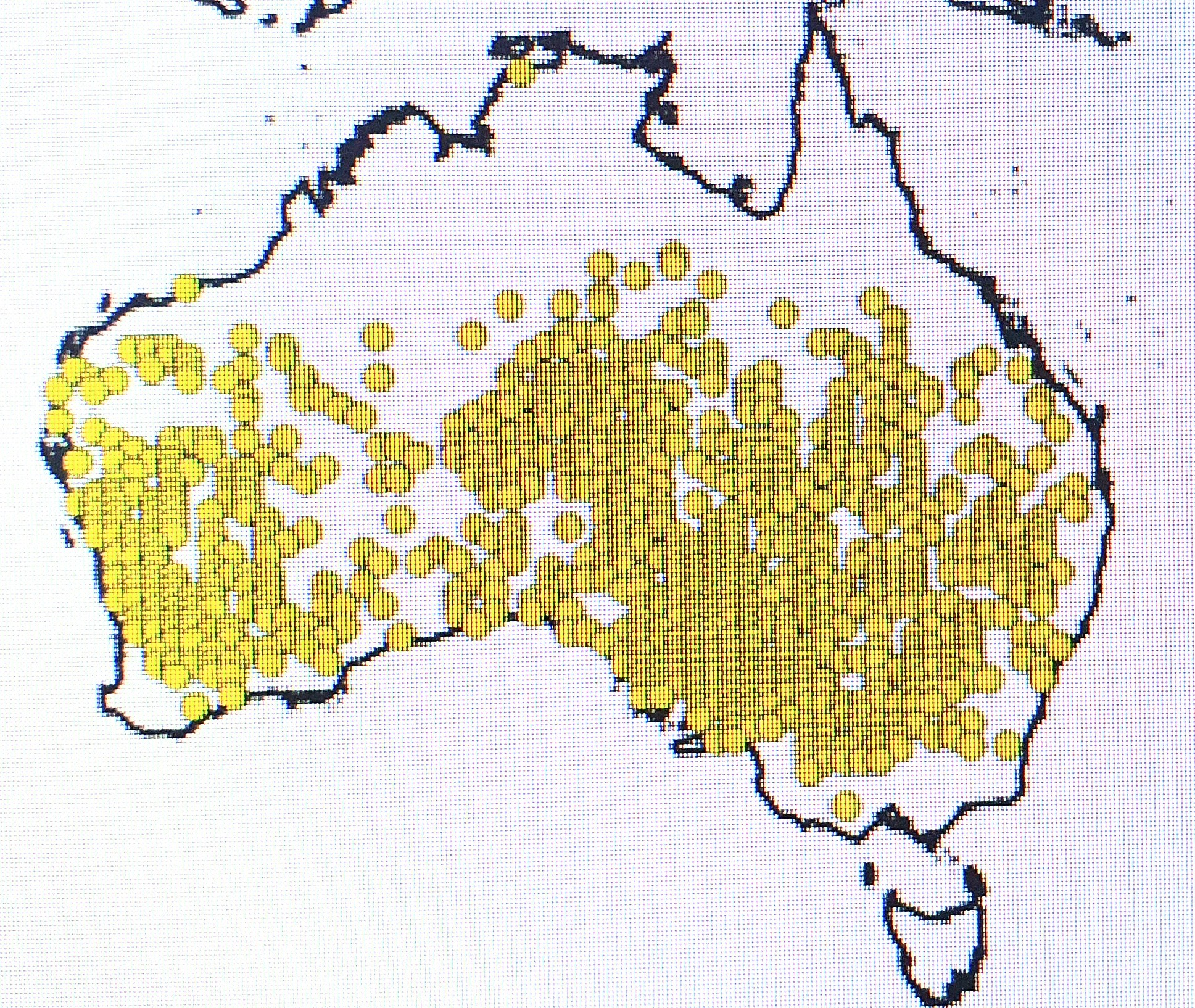
Known populations of Calotis hispidula

Calotis hispidula grows in heavy clays to shallow stony soils, in a wide variety of communities; it is widespread, especially in inland districts. Known and current populations range within New South Wales, Queensland, Victoria, Northern Territory, South Australia, and Western Australia. It is found abundantly in Central Australia.

== Conservation ==
There are no obvious threats to Calotis hispidula and it may not be in decline; however, weed invasion, clearing, agricultural activity, and grazing may impact this species. Very small localised populations are inherently at risk from chance events. Small populations are also more susceptible to adverse genetic influences, such as inbreeding depression. Experts doubt that Calotis plants survive more than two years, and it is suggested that this may be because of the invasion of Narrow-leaf Hop-bush, which tends to suppress herb growth.

The seeds are long lived in the soil and occasional substrate disturbance will not suppress the long-term viability of Calotis hispidula. Grazing is a potential threat to the populations, though the extent of the threat is uncertain. When mature, the plant is unlikely to be palatable due to the sharp, woody awns on the seeds. In dry times, the plant persists as seed in the soil and so would be unaffected by even heavy grazing pressure. Impacts are most likely in the period following emergence until maturity.
