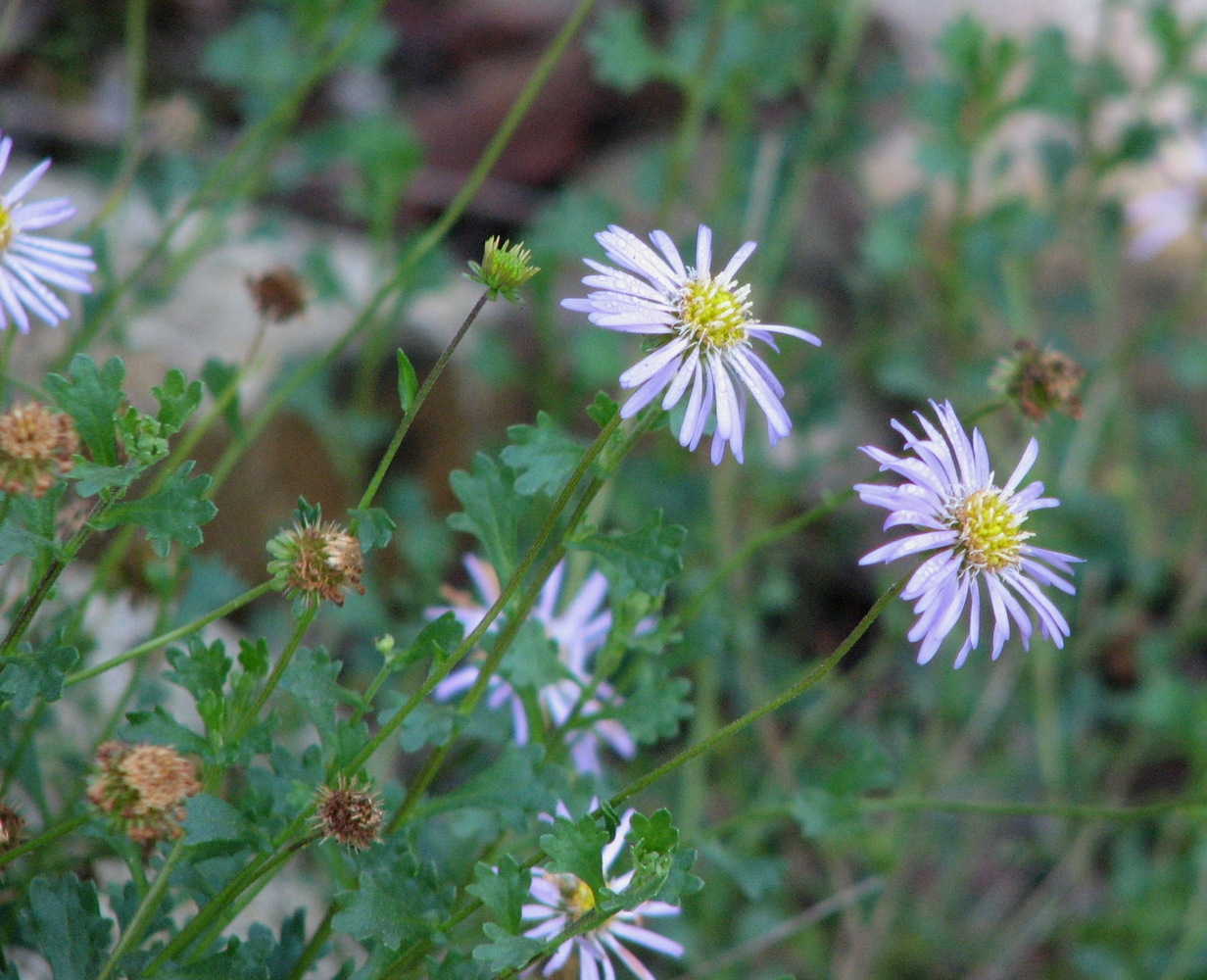
- Calotis cuneifolia

Scientific classification
- Kingdom: Plantae
- Clade: Embryophytes
- Clade: Tracheophytes
- Clade: Angiosperms
- Clade: Eudicots
- Clade: Asterids
- Order: Asterales
- Family: Asteraceae
- Subfamily: Asteroideae
- Tribe: Astereae
- Subtribe: Brachyscominae
- Genus: Calotis; R.Br.

Synonyms
- Cheiroloma F.Muell.; Goniopogon Turcz.; Tolbonia Kuntze

= Calotis =

Genus of flowering plants

Calotis is a genus of herbs or small shrubs in the daisy family Asteraceae. Most of the species are native to Australia, while two occur in Asia.

Species

- Calotis ancyrocarpa J.M.Black - anchor burr-daisy
- Calotis anthemoides F.Muell. - cut-leaved burr-daisy
- Calotis breviradiata(Ising) G.L.R.Davis
- Calotis breviseta Benth.
- Calotis cuneata (Benth.) G.L.R.Davis - mountain burr-daisy
- Calotis cuneifolia R.Br. - purple burr-daisy
- Calotis cymbacantha F.Muell. - showy burr-daisy
- Calotis dentex R.Br.
- Calotis erinacea Steetz - tangled burr-daisy
- Calotis glabrescens C.T.White
- Calotis glandulosa F.Muell.
- Calotis hispidula (F.Muell.) F.Muell. - bogan flea, bindy eye, hairy burr-daisy
- Calotis inermis Maiden & Betche - fluffy burr-daisy
- Calotis kempei F.Muell.
- Calotis lappulacea Benth. - yellow burr-daisy
- Calotis latiuscula F.Muell. & Tate
- Calotis moorei P.S.Short
- Calotis multicaulis (Turcz.) Druce - many-stemmed burr-daisy
- Calotis plumulifera F.Muell. - woolly-headed burr-daisy
- Calotis porphyroglossa Benth.) - channel burr-daisy
- Calotis pubescens (F.Muell. ex Benth.) N.G.Walsh & K.L.McDougall
- Calotis scabiosifolia Sond. - rough burr-daisy
- Calotis scapigera Hook. - tufted burr-daisy
- Calotis squamigera C.T.White
- Calotis suffruticosa Domin
- Calotis xanthosioidea Domin
