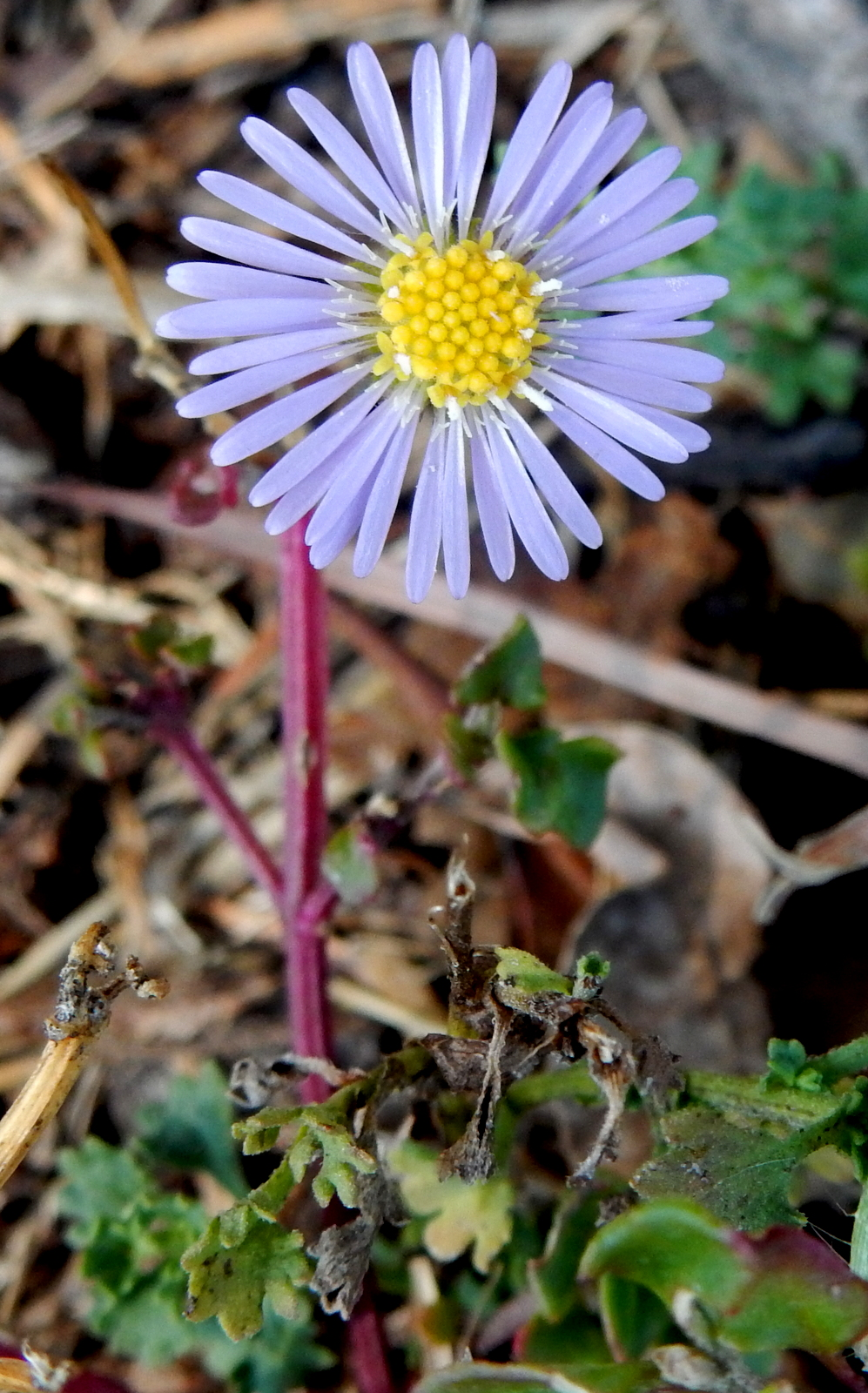
- At Rookwood, Australia

Scientific classification
- Kingdom: Plantae
- Clade: Embryophytes
- Clade: Tracheophytes
- Clade: Spermatophytes
- Clade: Angiosperms
- Clade: Eudicots
- Clade: Asterids
- Order: Asterales
- Family: Asteraceae
- Genus: Calotis
- Species: C. cuneifolia

Binomial name
- Calotis cuneifolia R.Br.

= Calotis cuneifolia =

Purple burr-daisy

Species of flowering plant

Calotis cuneifolia commonly known as purple burr-daisy, is a flowering plant in the family Asteraceae found in many parts of eastern and central Australia. It has purple, white or blue daisy-like flowers with variable shaped leaves.

== Description ==
Calotis cuneifolia is a small perennial upright or prostrate herb to 25–60 cm (9.8–23.6 in) high and covered with rigid hairs. The basal leaves more or less woody, soon withering, upper leaves wedge to spoon-shaped, lobed near the apex, 8–40 mm (0.31–1.57 in) long, 5–20 mm (0.20–0.79 in) wide, simple, sessile, occasional hairs and arranged alternately. The blue, white or purple flower heads 6–20 mm (0.24–0.79 in) in diameter, single or in two or three cymes on slender stems with a yellow disc. Flowering occurs mostly from September to December and the fruit is a flattened cypsela covered with barbed spines.

== Taxonomy and naming ==
Calotis cuneifolia was first formally described in 1810 by Robert Brown and the description was published in The Botanical Register: Consisting of Coloured Figures of Exotic Plants, Cultivated in British Gardens; with their History and Mode of Treatment. The type specimen was collected by Allan Cunningham on the banks of the Lachlan River in 1817. The specific epithet "cuneifolia" refers to the wedged shape leaves.

== Distribution and habitat ==
Purple burr-daisy grows in grassland and forests in a variety of soils in New South Wales, Queensland, Victoria, South Australia and the Northern Territory.
