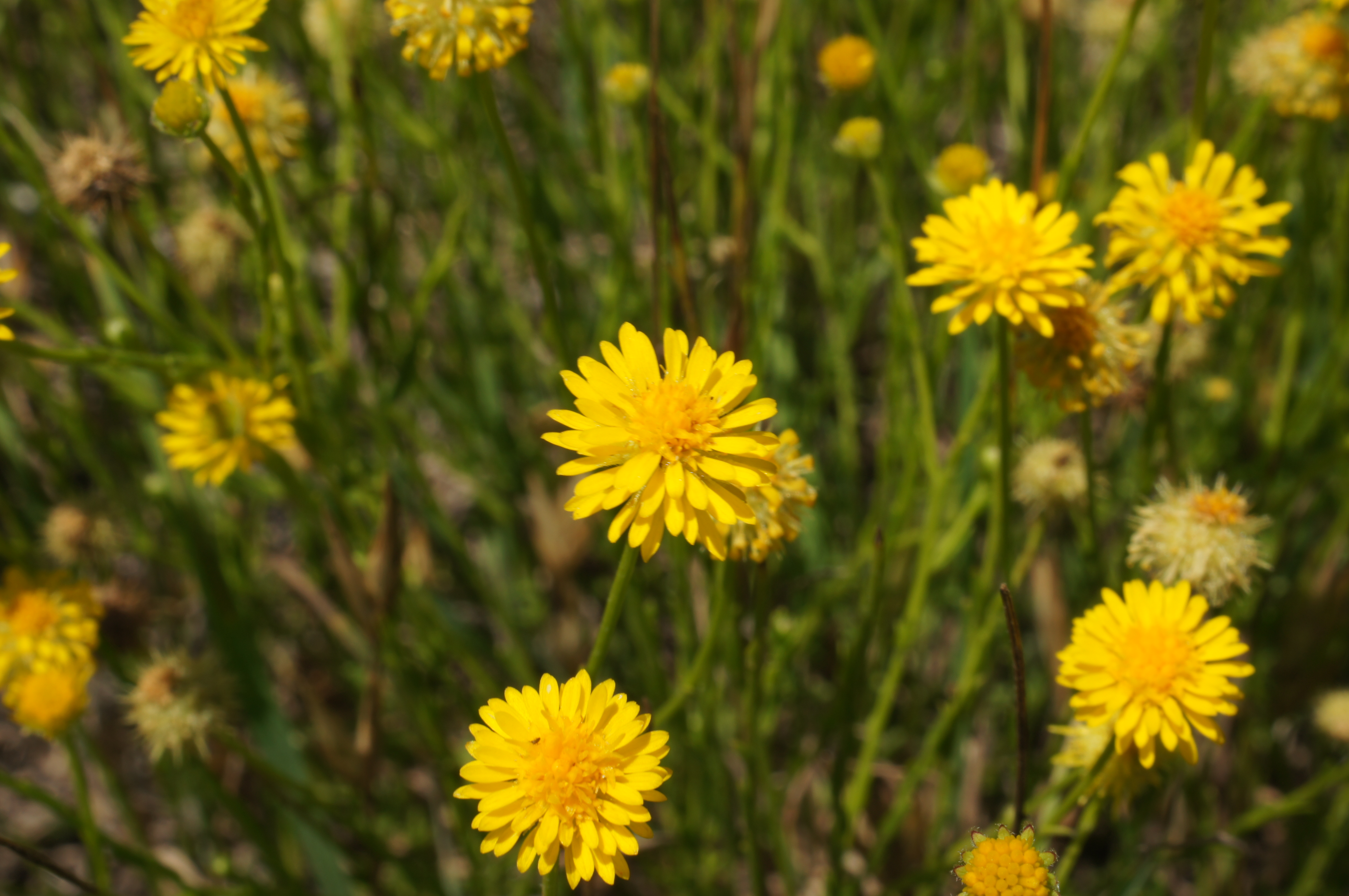

Scientific classification
- Kingdom: Plantae
- Clade: Tracheophytes
- Clade: Angiosperms
- Clade: Eudicots
- Clade: Asterids
- Order: Asterales
- Family: Asteraceae
- Genus: Calotis
- Species: C. lappulacea

Binomial name
- Calotis lappulacea Benth.

= Calotis lappulacea =

Yellow burr-daisy

Species of flowering plant

Calotis lappulacea, commonly known as the yellow burr-daisy, is a flowering plant in the family Asteraceae found in many parts of mainland Australia. It is a small, perennial herb with yellow globular flower-heads.

== Description ==
Calotis lappulacea is slender, upright or straggling, multi-branched perennial or small under-storey shrub to 20–50 cm (7.9–19.7 in) high. The stems and leaves are sparsely covered with coarse, rough to flattened, straight, rigid hairs. The leaves are oblong to narrowly egg-shaped, sessile, 4–20 mm (0.16–0.79 in) long, 1–4 mm (0.039–0.157 in) wide, entire or deeply divided, mostly toothed toward the apex and basal leaves. The globular-shaped flowers are at the end of upright stems, 3–8 mm (0.12–0.31 in) in diameter, florets 40-60, yellow and 2–4 mm (0.079–0.157 in) long. Flowering occurs mostly from September to January but may flower throughout the year. The fruit is an achene, flattened, warty, spiny and about 1.5 mm (0.059 in) long.

== Taxonomy and naming ==
The specific epithet "lappulacea" refers to the genus Lappula of stiffly hairy plants. The yellow burr-daisy first appeared in scientific literature in 1837, published by the systematic botanist George Bentham from a specimen in the collection of Charles von Hügel.

== Distribution and habitat ==
Yellow burr-daisy is a widespread species growing on a variety of soils including dry rocky situations, on heavy clay soils and occasionally in woodland in the Australian Capital Territory, Northern Territory and all mainland states of Australia.
