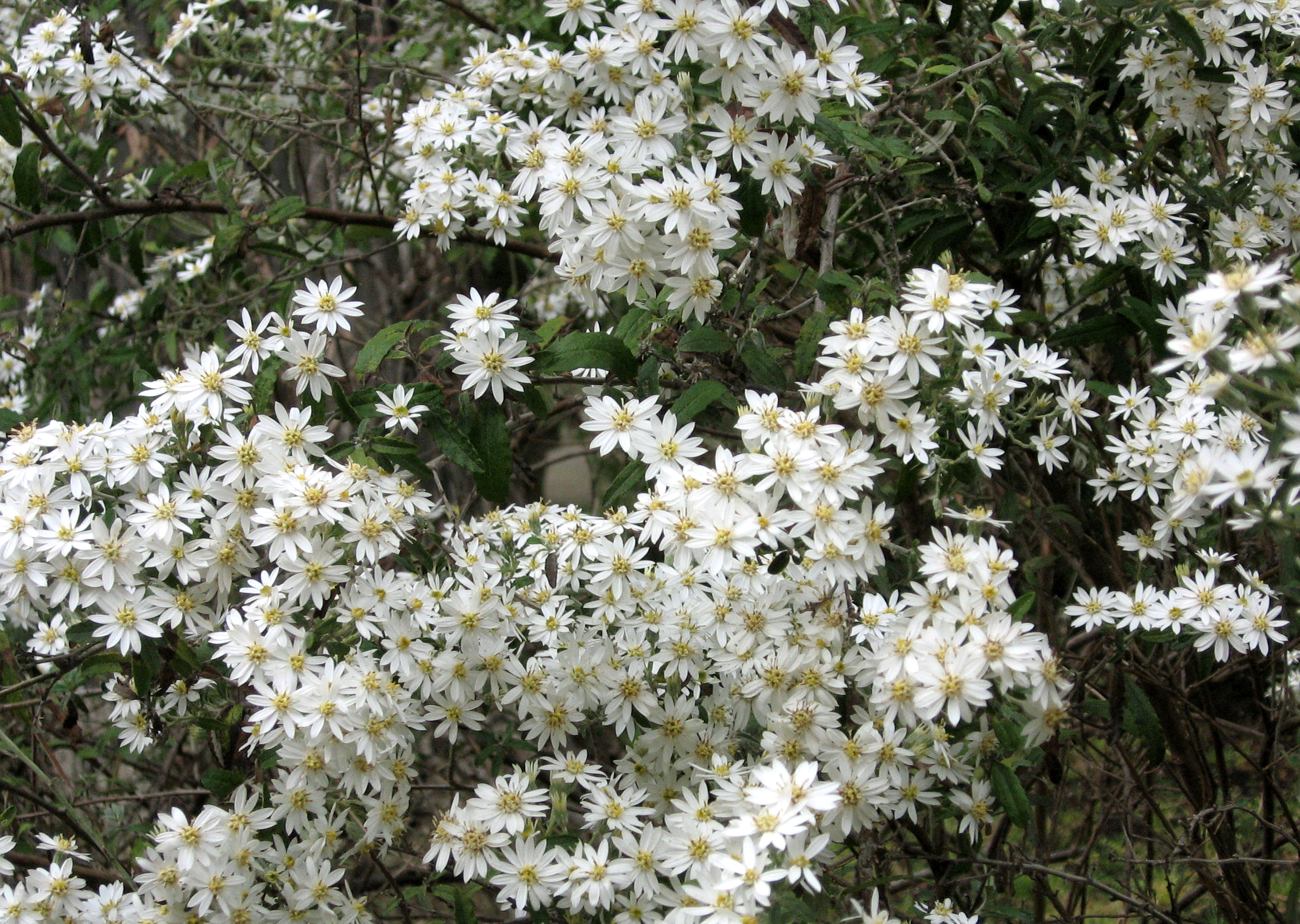

Scientific classification
- Kingdom: Plantae
- Clade: Tracheophytes
- Clade: Angiosperms
- Clade: Eudicots
- Clade: Asterids
- Order: Asterales
- Family: Asteraceae
- Genus: Olearia
- Species: O. phlogopappa

Binomial name
- Olearia phlogopappa (Labill.) DC.

Synonyms
- Aster phlogopappus Labill.; Aster phlogotrichus Spreng. nom. illeg., nom. superfl.; Diplostephium phlogotrichum Nees; Eurybia gunniana var. phlogopappa (Labill.) Sond.; Eurybia quercifolia Cass. nom. illeg.; Olearia gunniana var. phlogopappa (Labill.) Hutch. nom. illeg.; Olearia stellulata auct. non (Labill.) DC.:Benth.

= Olearia phlogopappa =

Species of flowering plant

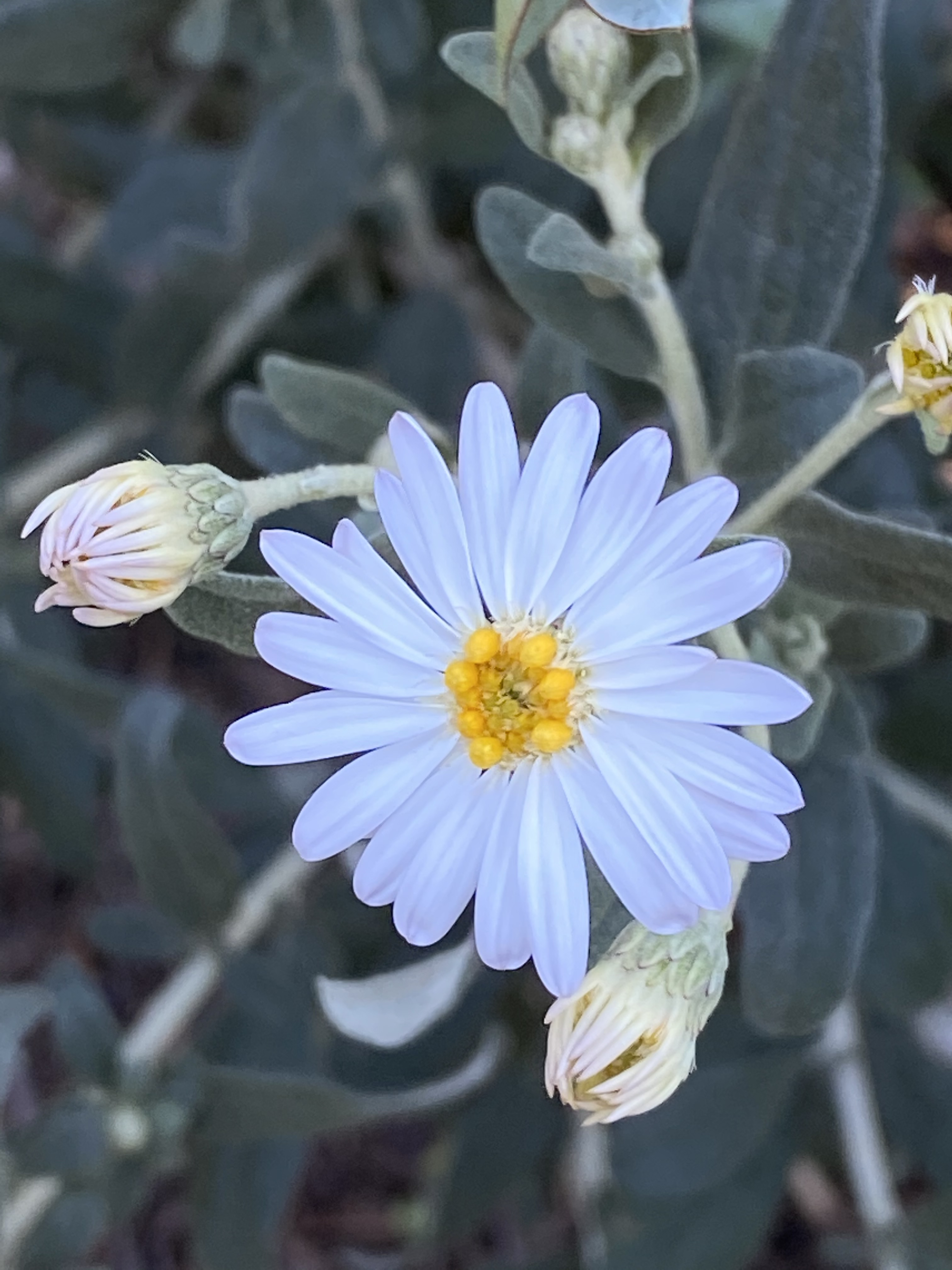
Olearia phlogopappa subsp. flavescens flower and buds

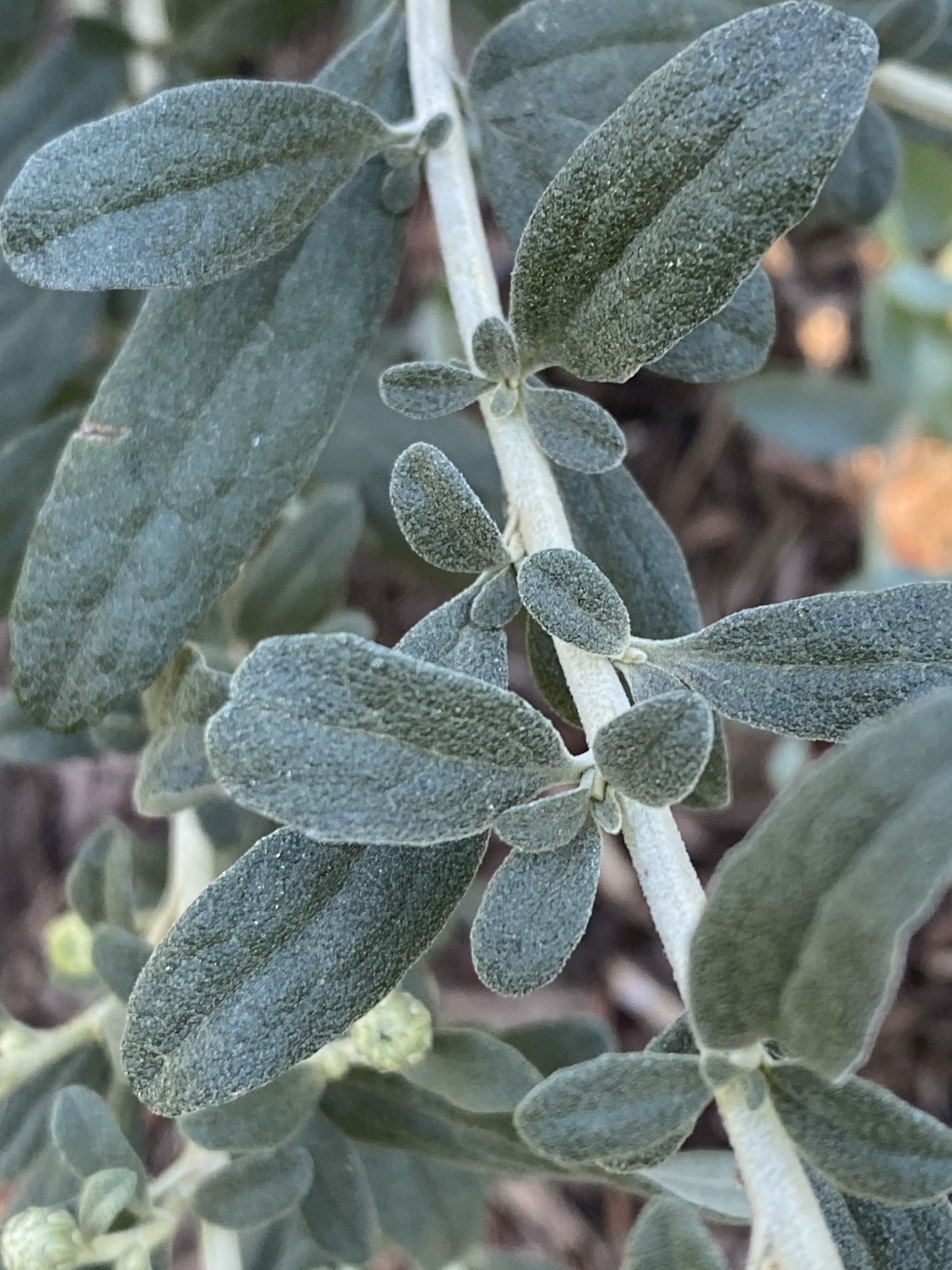
Olearia phlogopappa subsp. flavescens foliage

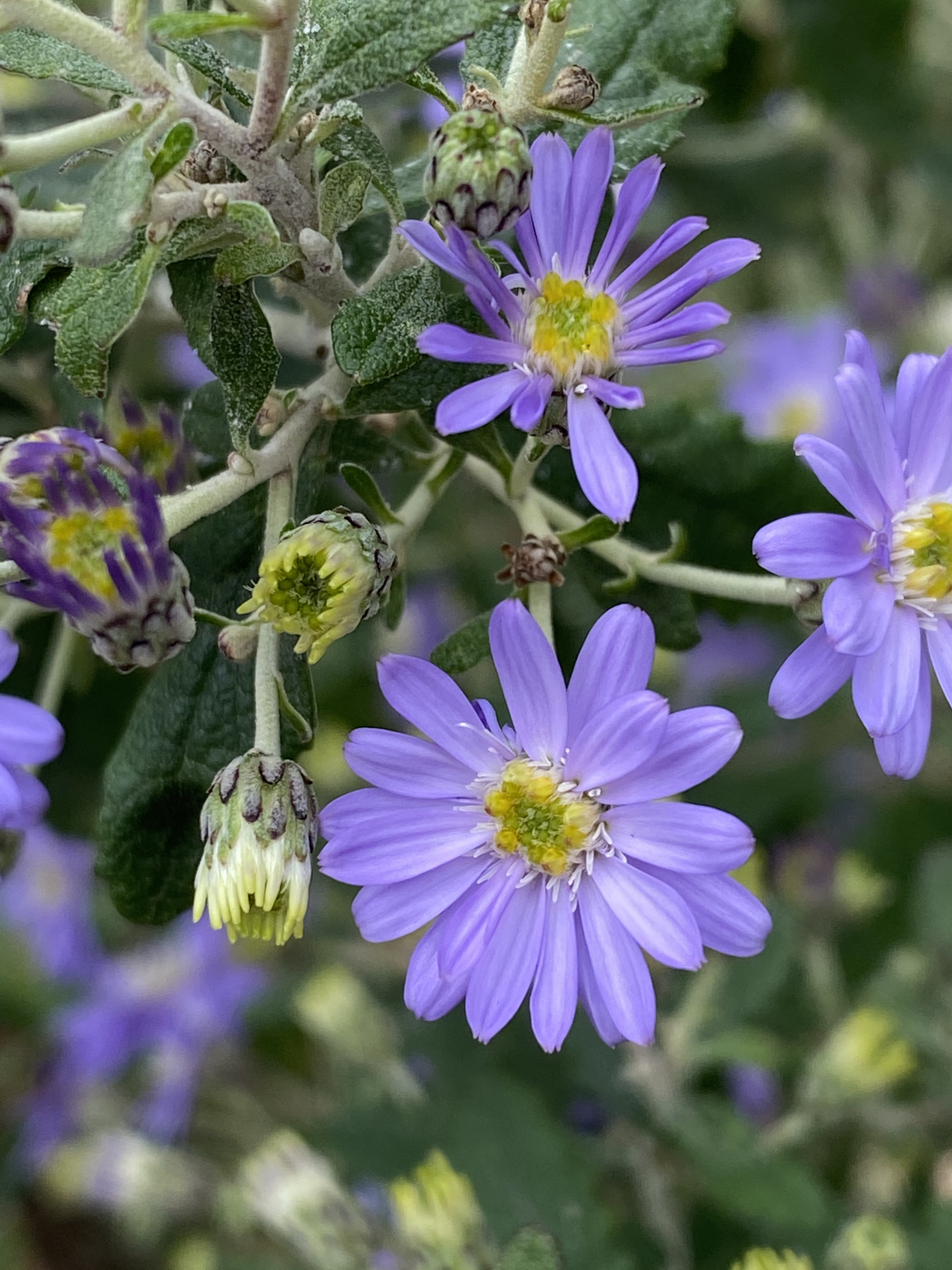
Mauve form

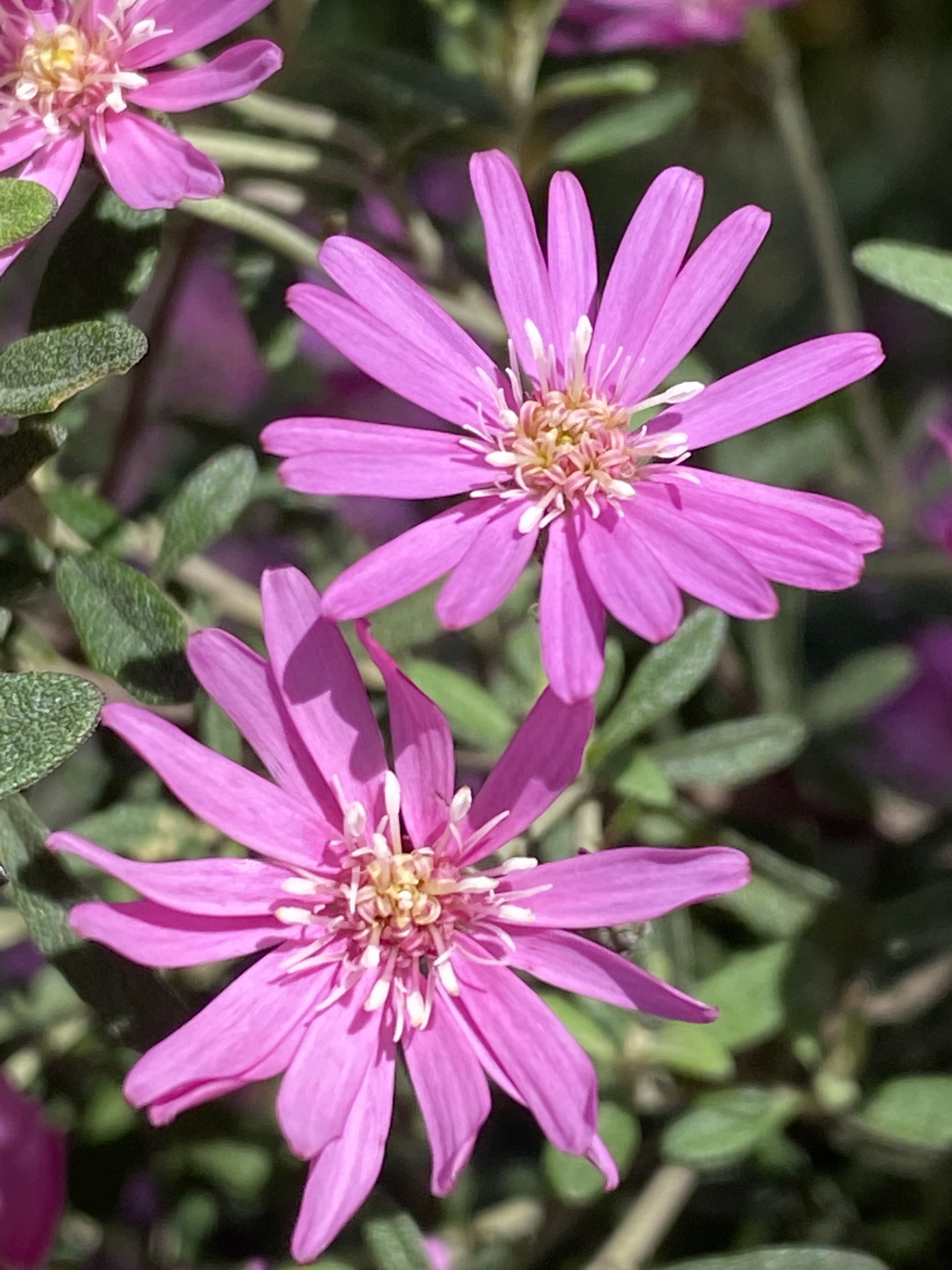
Pink form

Olearia phlogopappa commonly known as the dusty daisy-bush or alpine daisy-bush is a species of flowering plant in the family Asteraceae that is commonly found in eastern New South Wales, Victoria and Tasmania. It is a small shrub with greyish-green foliage, daisy-like flowers in white, pink or mauve that can be seen from spring to late summer.

== Description ==
Olearia phlogopappa is a small, erect shrub that grows 0.3–3 m (0.98–9.8 ft) high with greyish foliage. The leaves are arranged alternately, leaf shapes differ from narrow egg-shaped or narrow obovate 8–114 mm (0.31–4.5 in) long and 3–23 mm (0.12–0.91 in) wide on a short stalk. The upper leaf surface is a dull grey-green, smooth or with fine minute star-shaped hairs. The underside has a whitish or yellowish appearance. The leaf margins vary, they may be slightly scalloped, toothed or evenly spaced slanting serrations.

Dusty daisy-bush has varying colours with the most common being white but can be blue or pink. The flowers are in terminal clusters from the side branches about 15–25 mm (0.59–0.98 in) in diameter. The 4-5 bracts are bell-shaped to hemispherical, arranged in rows covered with short soft hairs, occasionally glandular. There are usually 10-14 ray florets on an individual "daisy" flowers and bloom in spring and early summer. The fruit has 5 ribs 2–3 mm (0.079–0.12 in) long and has a single seed called an achene.

== Taxonomy and naming ==
Olearia phlogopappa was first formally described by Jacques Labillardière in 1806 and published in Novae Hollandiae Plantarum Specimen and named Aster phlogopappus. The specific epithet (phlogopappa) is derived from the Ancient Greek words phlogos meaning "flame" and pappos meaning "pappus", referring to the flame-coloured ring of hairs above the ovary cited in the original description (pappo flammeo).

=== Subspecies ===
There are nine subspecies which are currently recognised by the Australian Plant Census:

- Olearia phlogopappa subsp. angustifolia (Hook.f.) Messina
- Olearia phlogopappa subsp. continentalis (Hook.f.) Messina a shrub up to 2 m (6.6 ft) tall, green egg-shaped leaves with uneven margins and star shaped hairs. Flowers from October to December.
- Olearia phlogopappa subsp. flavescens (Hutch.) Messina, an upright many branched shrub to 1.4 m (4.6 ft) high with egg-shaped to narrow elliptic thickly textured leaves. Leaf margins are entire or slightly lobed. The leaf topside is green or a dull green with star shaped hairs, on occasion with glands. Flowers from December to February.
- Olearia phlogopappa subsp. gunniana Messina
- Olearia phlogopappa subsp. insularis (Labill.) DC. a spreading shrub to 1.5 m (4.9 ft) high. The thick rough leaves may be either oblong, egg-shaped or narrowly elliptic, about 15–70 mm (0.59–2.8 in) long and 3–15 mm (0.12–0.59 in) wide. The upper side of leaves are yellowish-green or grey-green with slightly scalloped or rounded margins and a few star-shaped hairs. The underside of leaves are white, cream or grey and thickly covered in star-shaped hairs, sometimes glandular. The leaf stalk is 2–5 mm (0.079–0.20 in) long. Flowers appear from October to December.
- Olearia phlogopappa subsp. phlogopappa (Labill.) DC. a small shrub with a dense or open habit 1–3 m (3.3–9.8 ft) high and 1–2 m (3.3–6.6 ft) wide. Smaller branches are white to greyish and underside of leaves has a thick covering of small star-shaped hairs. The grey-green leaves are narrowly egg-shaped with toothed edges and a rounded apex. White flowers appear in clusters 25 mm (0.98 in) wide mainly at the end of branches. Flowering occurs from September to January.
- Olearia phlogopappa subsp. salicina Messina is an erect slender shrub to 2 m (6.6 ft) high. The leaves have a textured surface, lance to narrow-linear, 27–150 mm (1.1–5.9 in) long and 4–12 mm (0.16–0.47 in) wide with a smooth leaf margin. The green upper leaf surface has numerous to sparsely dispersed star shaped glandular hairs. The leaf underside is cream or white with either several or thickly matted star-shaped hairs with a varying number of glands and a smooth margin. Subspecies salicina is differentiated from other species by its obscure secondary veins and the dense covering of glands on leaves that have an unpleasant aroma when crushed. Flowers are usually in a loose clusters at the end of branchlets. Flowers from October to December.
- Olearia phlogopappa subsp. serrata Messina is a small shrub to 1 m (3.3 ft) high sometimes with suckering roots. The leaves are egg-shaped, 8–22.5 mm (0.31–0.89 in) long and 3.3–9 mm (0.13–0.35 in) wide with slanting toothed edges. The topside of the leaves is yellowish-green or green becoming smooth as they age. The underside of the leaf when young may be yellowish but generally white, cream or grey. Leaves are thickly covered with star-shaped hairs but without glands on a stalk 0.3–2.5 mm (0.012–0.098 in) long. The flowers are single or in a cluster of 2-3 flowers at the end of branches. Flowers from November to January.
- Olearia phlogopappa subsp. subrepanda (Hook.f) Messina

== Distribution and habitat ==
Olearia phlogopappa is widespread and common from coast to mountains, found in both dry and wet sclerophyll forests. Found in eastern New South Wales, Victoria, and Tasmania.

The genus Olearia is found in Australia, New Zealand and New Guinea and has about 130 species native to Australia.

- Subspecies continentalis grows in scattered locations in NSW and is common in Victoria, growing in moist to wet forest.
- Subspecies flavescens is found in NSW, widespread in Victoria in alpine and subalpine locations. Growing in heath, scrubland and rocky areas.
- Subspecies insularis grows in Victoria and Tasmania. Usually found growing in coastal heath, deep sand or sand dunes.
- Subspecies phlogopappa grows in Victoria in moist to wet situations with good drainage.
- Subspecies salicina restricted location in Victoria and Tasmania growing mostly in either wet forests to dry woodland.
- Subspecies serrata is found in Victoria and NSW with restricted distribution. Grows on slopes and close to headwaters in open heath near Eucalypt woodlands.

== Cultivation ==
The species withstands moderate frost and drought, but prefers moist conditions and a well-drained soil in a sunny position, flowering reduced with part shaded positions. Pruning is required to stop plants becoming spindly. Propagate from seed or tip cuttings.

=== Cultivars ===
A number of cultivars are commercially available including:

- 'Comber's Blue'
- 'Comber's Mauve'
- 'Comber's Pink'
- 'Exbury White'
- pink-flowered
- 'Rosea'
- 'Sawtooth'
- 'Splendens Group'
- 'Tournaig Titch'
