= Neville Grant Walsh =

Australian botanist

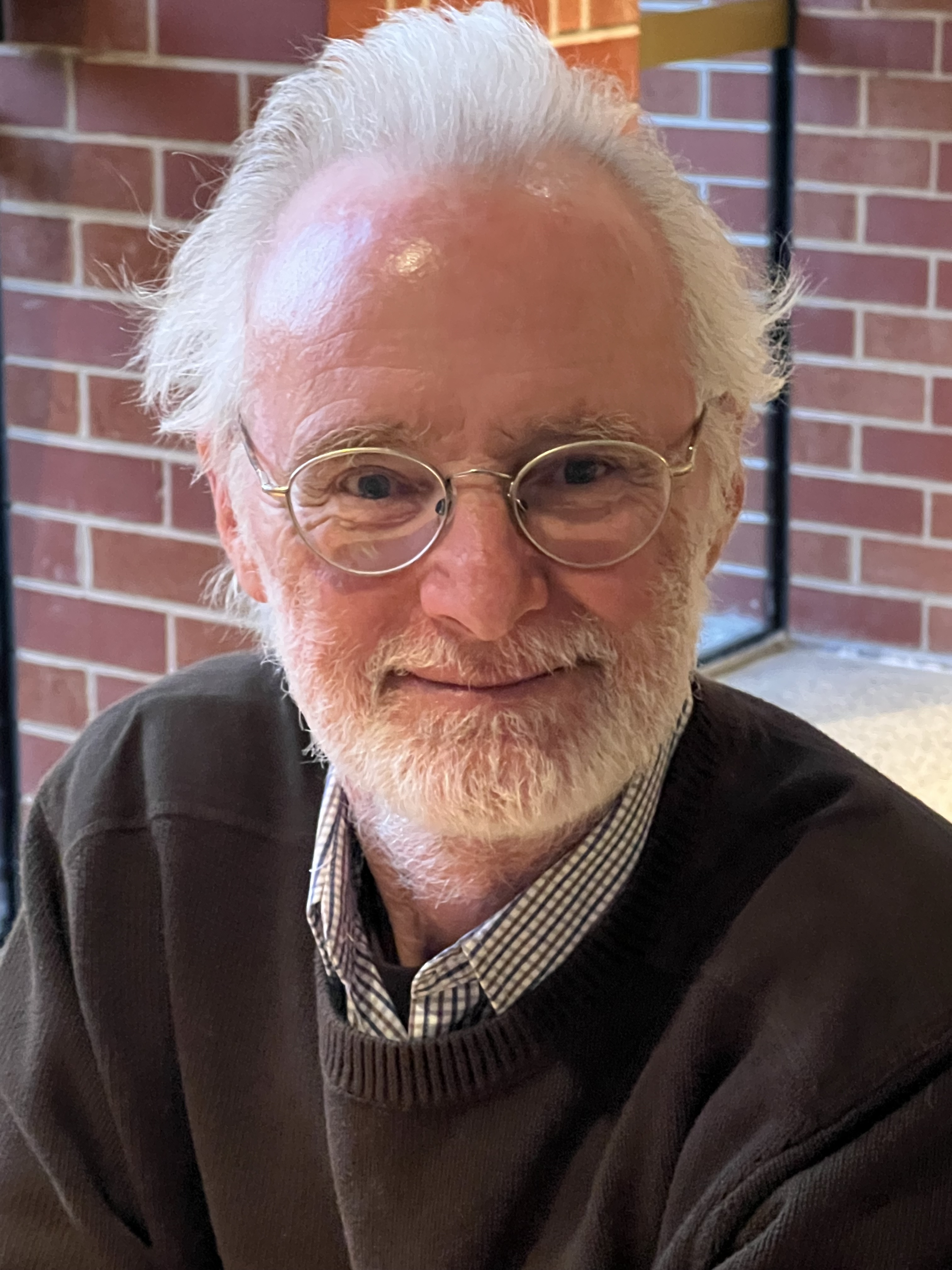
- Born: 1956
- Academic career
- Institutions: Royal Botanic Gardens Melbourne; National Herbarium of Victoria (1977–)
- Author abbrev. (botany): N.G.Walsh

Neville Grant Walsh (born 1956) has worked at the National Herbarium of Victoria from 1977.

Walsh and Don Foreman authored the first volume of Flora of Victoria, authoring a further three with Timothy Entwisle, and Volume 4

He has published the name of 112 new species of plants in more than 80 peer-reviewed papers. He has served on the working group (vascular plants) for the Council of Heads of Australasian Herbaria since 2005, and in 2010 served as its taxonomic advisor on the Campanulaceae family. He has also contributed his knowledge of plant communities in the Victorian Alps to the Mountain Invasion Research Network. He retired in 2023, but maintains an active interest in Australian plant taxonomy and ecology.

== Some taxa authored ==
- Boronia citrata N.G.Walsh, Muelleria 8(1): 21 (1993).
- Calotis pubescens (F.Muell. ex Benth.) N.G.Walsh & K.L.McDougall, Muelleria 16: 44 (2002).
- Cassinia rugata N.G.Walsh, Muelleria 7(2): 141 (1990).
- Centipeda aotearoana N.G.Walsh, Muelleria 15: 55 (2001).
- See also Category:Taxa named by Neville Grant Walsh
