= A. montana =

A. montana may refer to:

- Acacia montana, mallee wattle, an Australian shrub
- Acromantis montana, a praying mantis
- Actinodaphne montana, a plant in the family Lauraceae
- Agathis montana, the Mount Panié kauri, a species of conifer of the family Araucariaceae
- Agyneta montana, a sheet weaver (spider)
- Ambulyx montana, a moth of the family Sphingidae
- Anastrangalia montana, a beetle
- Annona montana, mountain soursop, a plant of the custard apple family
- Anodonthyla montana, a frog of the family Microhylidae
- Anthene montana, a butterfly in the family Lycaenidae
- Anthyllis montana, mountain kidney vetch
- Apatophysis montana, a beetle of the family Cerambycidae
- Araucaria montana, a conifer
- Arenaria montana, mountain sandwort
- Argentulia montana, a moth
- Arnica montana, Wolf's bane, or mountain tobacco
