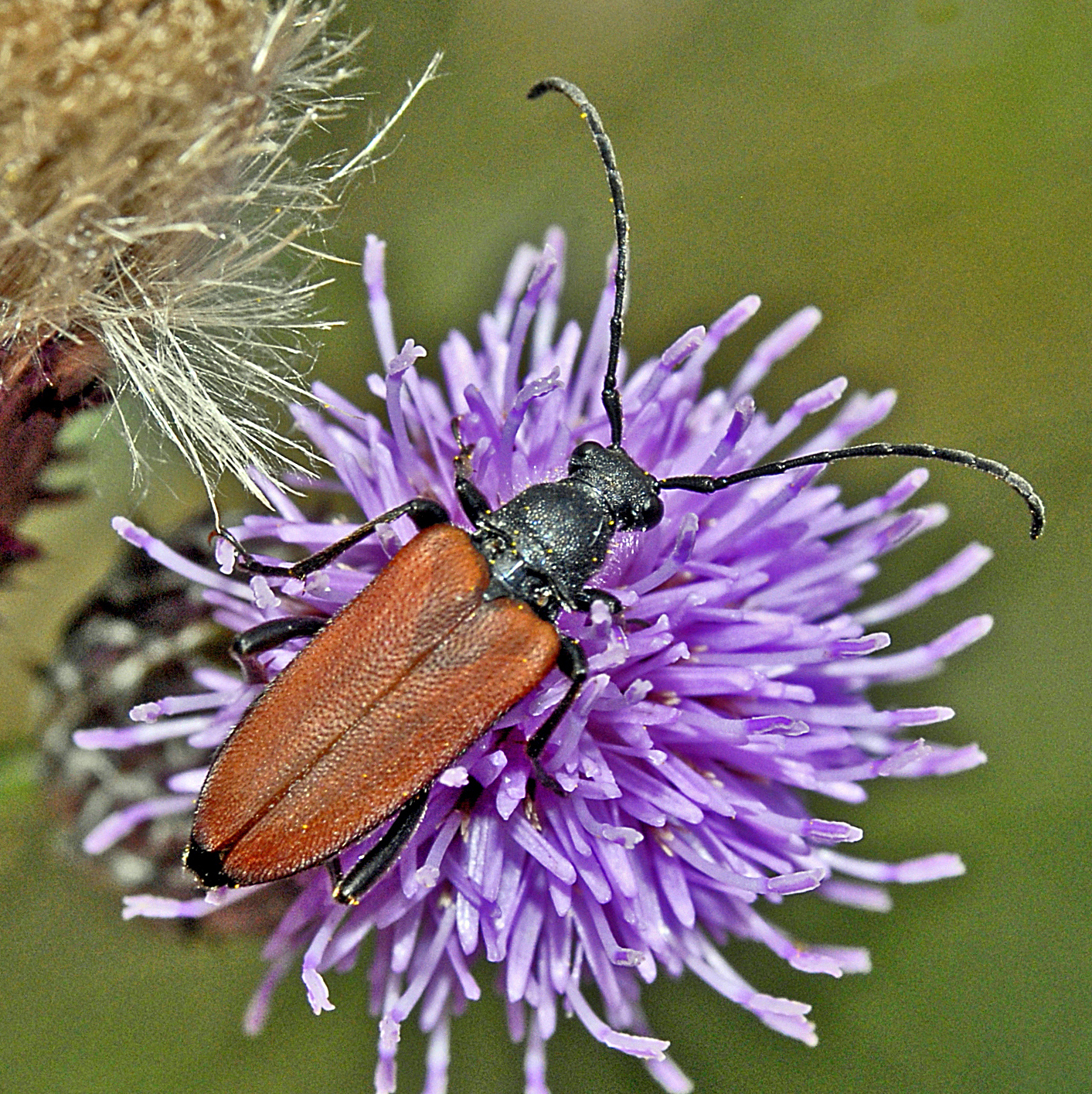
- Anastrangalia dubia dubia, female

Scientific classification
- Domain: Eukaryota
- Kingdom: Animalia
- Phylum: Arthropoda
- Class: Insecta
- Order: Coleoptera
- Suborder: Polyphaga
- Infraorder: Cucujiformia
- Family: Cerambycidae
- Genus: Anastrangalia
- Species: A. dubia

Binomial name
- Anastrangalia dubia (Scopoli, 1763)

Synonyms
- Corymbia (Anastrangalia) dubia (Scopoli) Pesarini & Sabbadini, 1994; Leptura cincta Gyllenhal, 1827 nec Panzer, 1804; Leptura dubia Scopoli, 1763; Leptura variabilis Paykull, 1800 nec DeGeer, 1775; Marthaleptura dubia (Scopoli) Ohbayashi, 1963

= Anastrangalia dubia =

Species of beetle

Anastrangalia dubia is a species of beetle of family Cerambycidae.

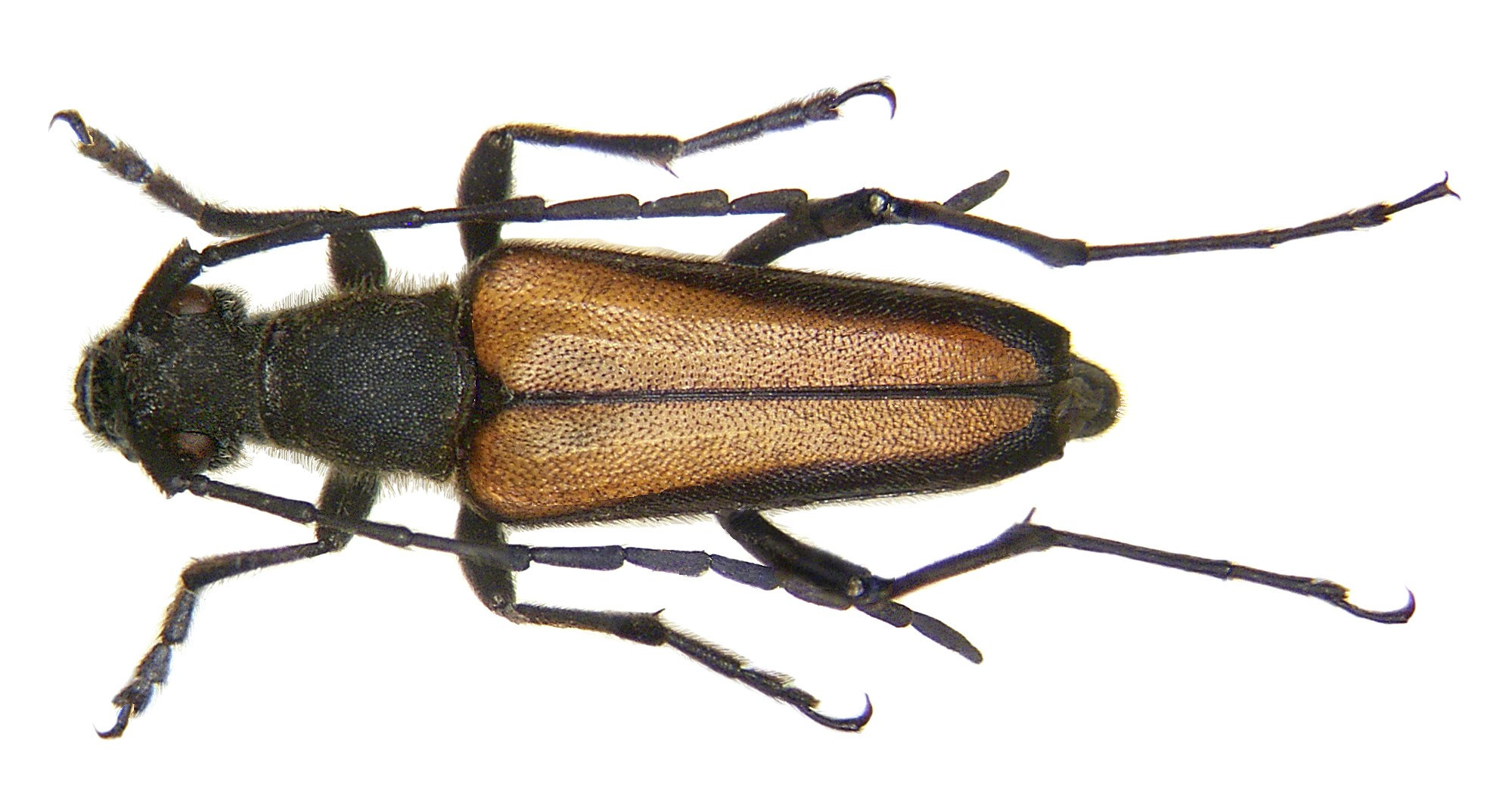
Anastrangalia dubia, male

== Subspecies and varietas ==
Subspecies and varietas within this species include:

- Anastrangalia dubia melanota (Faldermann, 1837)
- Anastrangalia dubia dubia (Scopoli, 1763)
  - Anastrangalia dubia dubia var. chamomillae (Fabricius, 1801)
  - Anastrangalia dubia dubia var. curtelineata (Pic, 1941)
  - Anastrangalia dubia dubia var. diffusa Boos
  - Anastrangalia dubia dubia var. graeca (Pic, 1932)
  - Anastrangalia dubia dubia var. limbata (Laicharting, 1784)
  - Anastrangalia dubia dubia var. moreana (Pic, 1906)
  - Anastrangalia dubia dubia var. planeti (Pic, 1945)
  - Anastrangalia dubia dubia var. triangulifera (Reitter, 1898)

== Description ==
Anastrangalia dubia can reach a length of 8–16 millimetres (0.31–0.63 in). The pronotum is narrow, bell-shaped, slightly hairy and considerably longer than wide. The elytrae are finely and uniformly punctured. Genders and variations of this species could have different colours. That way, the species can come as black, brown, or red coloured. Usually head, antennae, pronotum and legs are black. In the males the elytrae may be yellow-brown with a dark elytral suture and a more or less broad dark elytral edge, while in the females they are reddish-brown with or without blackish edges. Completely black specimens are more common in females, while in the males they are quite rare. Similar species are Anastrangalia reyi and Anastrangalia sanguinolenta. In A. dubia on the head the angles of the cheeks are acute, while in A. reyi they are obtuse.

== Biology ==
Larvae of these of wood-boring beetles feed on dead wood, dead branches and tree stumps of various deciduous and coniferous trees (mainly fir, pine and spruce). The development requires two to three years. The adults fly from May to August.

== Distribution ==
This species is found in montane and subalpine areas everywhere in Europe (except for Estonia). These beetles can also be found in African and Asian countries such as Algeria, Caucasus, North Iran, and Turkey.

== Bibliography ==
- A. Scopoli: Entomologia Carniolica exhibens insecta Carnioliæ indigena et distributa in ordines, genera, species, varietates. Methodo Linnæana Vindobonae 1763
- Heinz Freude, Karl Wilhelm Harde (Hrsg.), Gustav Adolf Lohse (Hrsg.): Die Käfer Mitteleuropas. Band 9. Cerambycidae Chrysomelidae, Spektrum Akademischer Verlag, München 1966, ISBN 3-8274-0683-8.
- Wilhelm H. Lucht, Bernhard Klausnitzer: Die Käfer Mitteleuropas. 4. Supplementband, Gustav Fischer, Jena 1998, ISBN 3-437-35366-7.
- Klaus Koch: Die Käfer Mitteleuropas. Band 3: Ökologie, Goecke & Evers, Krefeld 1992, ISBN 3-87263-042-3.
- Adolf Horion: Faunistik der mitteleuropäischen Käfer, Bd. XII. Überlingen-Bodensee 1974
