= Anastrangalia rubriola kashmirica =

Scientific classification
- Kingdom: Animalia
- Phylum: Arthropoda
- Class: Insecta
- Order: Coleoptera
- Suborder: Polyphaga
- Infraorder: Cucujiformia
- Family: Cerambycidae
- Genus: Anastrangalia
- Species: A. rubriola
- Subspecies: A. r. kashmirica

Trinomial name
- Anastrangalia rubriola kashmirica (Plavilstshikov, 1927)

Synonyms
- Leptura rubriola kashmirica Plavilstshikov, 1927

Species of beetle

Anastrangalia rubriola kashmirica is a subspecies of beetle from the family Cerambycidae.
