= Anastrangalia dissimilis dissimilis =

Scientific classification
- Domain: Eukaryota
- Kingdom: Animalia
- Phylum: Arthropoda
- Class: Insecta
- Order: Coleoptera
- Suborder: Polyphaga
- Infraorder: Cucujiformia
- Family: Cerambycidae
- Genus: Anastrangalia
- Species: A. dissimilis
- Subspecies: A. d. dissimilis

Trinomial name
- Anastrangalia dissimilis dissimilis (Fairmaire, 1900)

Synonyms
- Anoplodera dissimilis dissimilis (Fairmaire) Gressitt, 1951

Subspecies of beetle

Anastrangalia dissimilis dissimilis is a species of beetle from family Cerambycidae.
