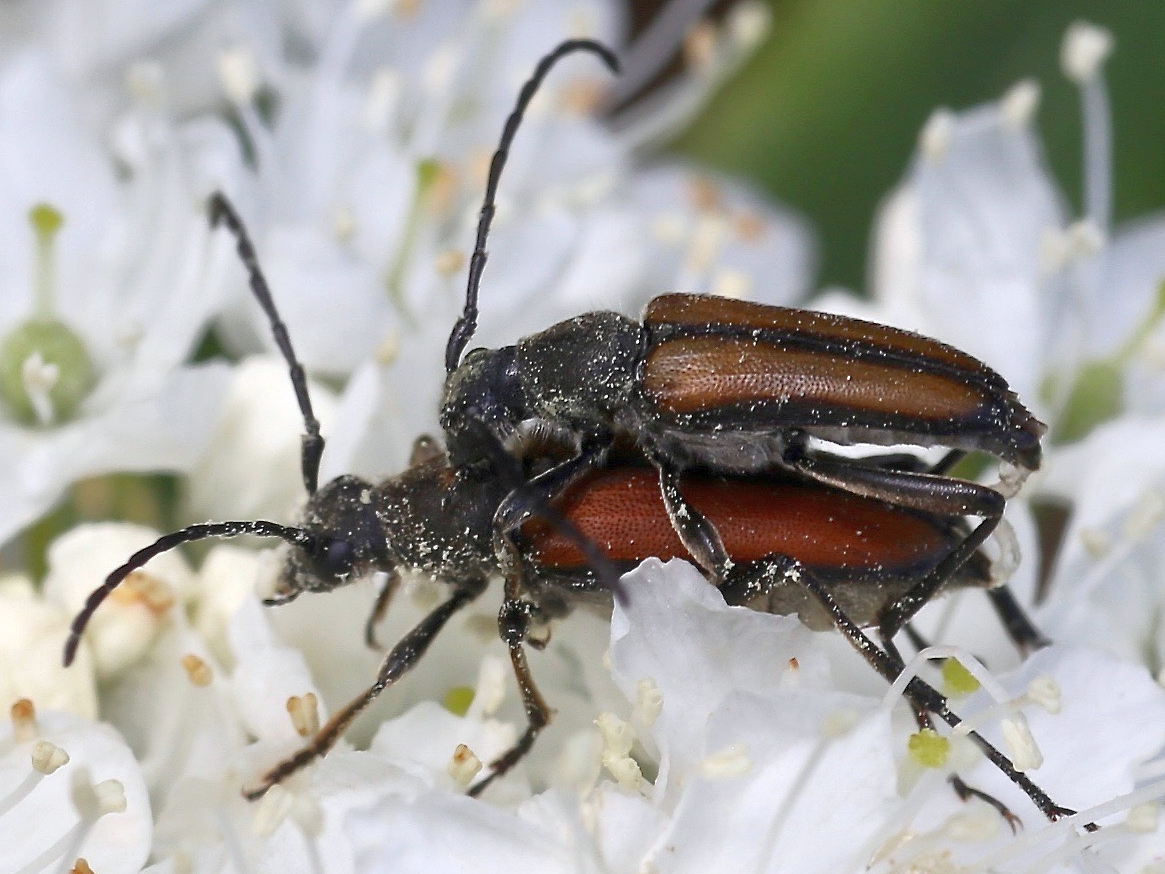

Scientific classification
- Kingdom: Animalia
- Phylum: Arthropoda
- Clade: Pancrustacea
- Class: Insecta
- Order: Coleoptera
- Suborder: Polyphaga
- Infraorder: Cucujiformia
- Family: Cerambycidae
- Genus: Anastrangalia
- Species: A. reyi
- Subspecies: A. r. sequensi

Trinomial name
- Anastrangalia reyi sequensi (Reitter, 1898)

Synonyms
- Anastrangalia sequensi Reitter, 1898; Anoplodera sequensi (Reitter) Gressitt, 1951; Leptura sequensi Reitter, 1898; Marthaleptura sequensi (Reitter) Ohbayashi, 1963

= Anastrangalia reyi sequensi =

Subspecies of beetle

Anastrangalia reyi sequensi is a subspecies of beetle from the family Cerambycidae, that can be found in such Asian countries as China, Japan, Kazakhstan, and Mongolia. The species have brown pronotum.
