= Anastrangalia reyi reyi =

Scientific classification
- Domain: Eukaryota
- Kingdom: Animalia
- Phylum: Arthropoda
- Class: Insecta
- Order: Coleoptera
- Suborder: Polyphaga
- Infraorder: Cucujiformia
- Family: Cerambycidae
- Genus: Anastrangalia
- Species: A. reyi
- Subspecies: A. r. reyi

Trinomial name
- Anastrangalia reyi reyi (Heyden, 1889)

Synonyms
- Leptura inexpectata Jannson & Sjöberg, 1928; Leptura sequensi inexpectata (Jannson & Sjöberg) Kinel, 1931; Marthaleptura inexpectata (Jannson & Sjöberg) Ohbayashi, 1963

Subspecies of beetle

Anastrangalia reyi reyi is a subspecies of beetle from family Cerambycidae, that can be found in such European countries as Austria, Belarus, Czech Republic, Finland, France, Germany, Italy, Poland, Slovakia, Sweden, Switzerland, Ukraine, and the Baltic states.
