= Anastrangalia sanguinea =

Scientific classification
- Domain: Eukaryota
- Kingdom: Animalia
- Phylum: Arthropoda
- Class: Insecta
- Order: Coleoptera
- Suborder: Polyphaga
- Infraorder: Cucujiformia
- Family: Cerambycidae
- Genus: Anastrangalia
- Species: A. sanguinea

Binomial name
- Anastrangalia sanguinea (LeConte, 1859)

Synonyms
- Anoplodera sanguinea (LeConte) Swaine & Hopping, 1928; Brachyleptura boulderensis Casey, 1913; Brachyleptura sanguinea (LeConte) Casey, 1913; Leptura sanguinea LeConte, 1869; Strangalia apicata Casey, 1924; Strangalia boulderensis (Casey) Casey, 1924; Strangalia sanguinea (LeConte) Casey, 1924

Species of beetle

Anastrangalia sanguinea is a species of beetle from family Cerambycidae.
