= Anastrangalia haldemani =

Scientific classification
- Kingdom: Animalia
- Phylum: Arthropoda
- Class: Insecta
- Order: Coleoptera
- Suborder: Polyphaga
- Infraorder: Cucujiformia
- Family: Cerambycidae
- Genus: Anastrangalia
- Species: A. haldemani

Binomial name
- Anastrangalia haldemani (Casey, 1891)

Synonyms
- Anoplodera haldemani (Casey) Swaine & Hopping, 1928; Anoplodera lucifera (Hopping) Swaine & Hopping, 1928; Brachyleptura haldemani (Casey) Casey, 1913; Leptura haldemani Casey, 1891; Leptura lucifera Hopping, 1922; Strangalia haldemani (Casey) Casey, 1924

Species of beetle

Anastrangalia haldemani is a species of beetle from family Cerambycidae, that could be found in Canada, United States, and Mexico.
