= Anastrangalia dissimilis =

Scientific classification
- Domain: Eukaryota
- Kingdom: Animalia
- Phylum: Arthropoda
- Class: Insecta
- Order: Coleoptera
- Suborder: Polyphaga
- Infraorder: Cucujiformia
- Family: Cerambycidae
- Genus: Anastrangalia
- Species: A. dissimilis

Binomial name
- Anastrangalia dissimilis (Fairmaire, 1900)

Synonyms
- Anoplodera dissimilis (Fairmaire) Gressitt, 1951; Leptura dissimilis Fairmaire, 1900; Marthaleptura dissimilis (Fairmaire) Ohbayashi, 1963

Species of beetle

Anastrangalia dissimilis is a species of beetle from family Cerambycidae.

== Subspecies ==
- Anastrangalia dissimilis dissimilis (Fairmaire, 1900)
- Anastrangalia dissimilis niitakana (Kano, 1933)
