= Anastrangalia scotodes =

Scientific classification
- Domain: Eukaryota
- Kingdom: Animalia
- Phylum: Arthropoda
- Class: Insecta
- Order: Coleoptera
- Suborder: Polyphaga
- Infraorder: Cucujiformia
- Family: Cerambycidae
- Genus: Anastrangalia
- Species: A. scotodes

Binomial name
- Anastrangalia scotodes (Bates, 1873)

Synonyms
- Aredolpona scotodes; (Bates) Nakane & Ohbayashi, 1957: Leptura kongoensis Matsushita, 1933; Leptura scotodes Bates, 1873; Marthaleptura scotodes (Bates) Ohbayashi, 1963

Species of beetle

Anastrangalia scotodes is a species of beetle from family Cerambycidae. They live especially in Africa.
