= Anastrangalia rubriola =

Scientific classification
- Kingdom: Animalia
- Phylum: Arthropoda
- Class: Insecta
- Order: Coleoptera
- Suborder: Polyphaga
- Infraorder: Cucujiformia
- Family: Cerambycidae
- Genus: Anastrangalia
- Species: A. rubriola

Binomial name
- Anastrangalia rubriola (Bates, 1878)

Synonyms
- Leptura rubriola Bates, 1878

Species of beetle

Anastrangalia rubriola is a species of beetle from family Cerambycidae that feed on morinda spruce.

== Subspecies ==
- Anastrangalia rubriola kashmirica (Plavilstshikov)
- Anastrangalia rubriola rubriola (Bates, 1878)
