= Anastrangalia kasaharai =

Scientific classification
- Domain: Eukaryota
- Kingdom: Animalia
- Phylum: Arthropoda
- Class: Insecta
- Order: Coleoptera
- Suborder: Polyphaga
- Infraorder: Cucujiformia
- Family: Cerambycidae
- Genus: Anastrangalia
- Species: A. kasaharai

Binomial name
- Anastrangalia kasaharai (Makihara, 2002)

Synonyms
- Anastrangalia dissimilis (Fairmaire) Kusama & Takakuwa, 1984; Aredolpona dissimilis (Fairmaire) Hayashi, 1961; Aredolpona hirayamai (Matsushita & Tamanuki) Hayashi, 1961; Marthaleptura dissimilis (Fairmaire) Kojima & Hayashi, 1969; Marthaleptura hirayamai (Matsushita & Tamanuki) Kojima & Hayashi, 1969

Species of beetle

Anastrangalia kasaharai is a species of beetle from family Cerambycidae that is endemic to Japan. The species are either black or red coloured.
