= Anastrangalia renardi =

Scientific classification
- Kingdom: Animalia
- Phylum: Arthropoda
- Class: Insecta
- Order: Coleoptera
- Suborder: Polyphaga
- Infraorder: Cucujiformia
- Family: Cerambycidae
- Genus: Anastrangalia
- Species: A. renardi

Binomial name
- Anastrangalia renardi (Gebler, 1848)

Synonyms
- Anoplodera renardi (Gebler); Leptura renardi Gebler, 1848

Species of beetle

Anastrangalia renardi is a species of beetle from family Cerambycidae, that is endemic to Mongolia.
