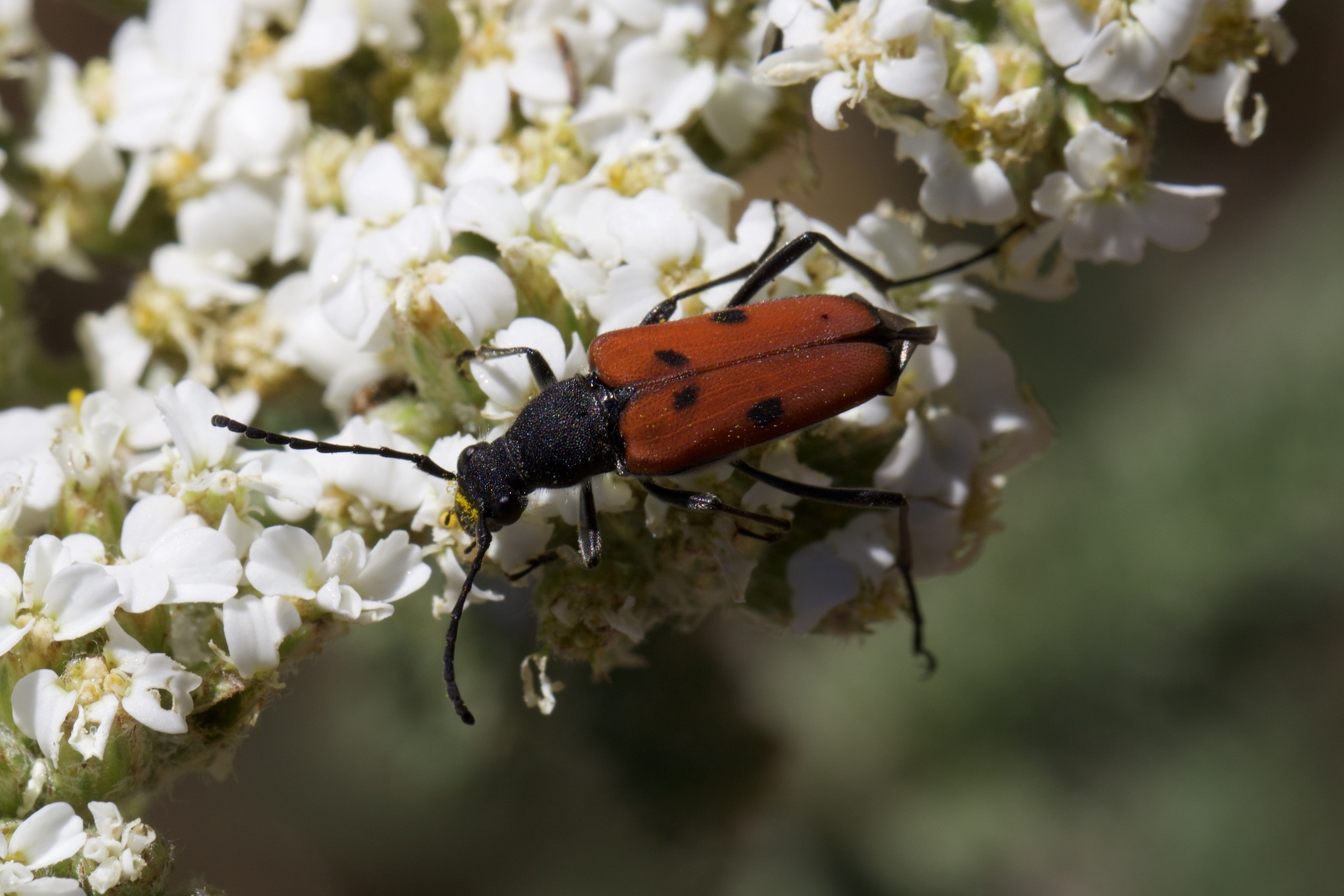
- Female Anastrangalia laetifica, California

Scientific classification
- Domain: Eukaryota
- Kingdom: Animalia
- Phylum: Arthropoda
- Class: Insecta
- Order: Coleoptera
- Suborder: Polyphaga
- Infraorder: Cucujiformia
- Family: Cerambycidae
- Genus: Anastrangalia
- Species: A. laetifica

Binomial name
- Anastrangalia laetifica (LeConte, 1859)

Synonyms
- Anoplodera laetifica (LeConte) Swaine & Hopping, 1928; Brachyleptura laetifica (LeConte) Casey, 1913; Leptura laetifica LeConte, 1859; Leptura lugens LeConte, 1859; Marthaleptura laetifica (LeConte) Ohbayashi, 1963; Strangalia laetifica (LeConte) Casey, 1924

= Anastrangalia laetifica =

Species of beetle

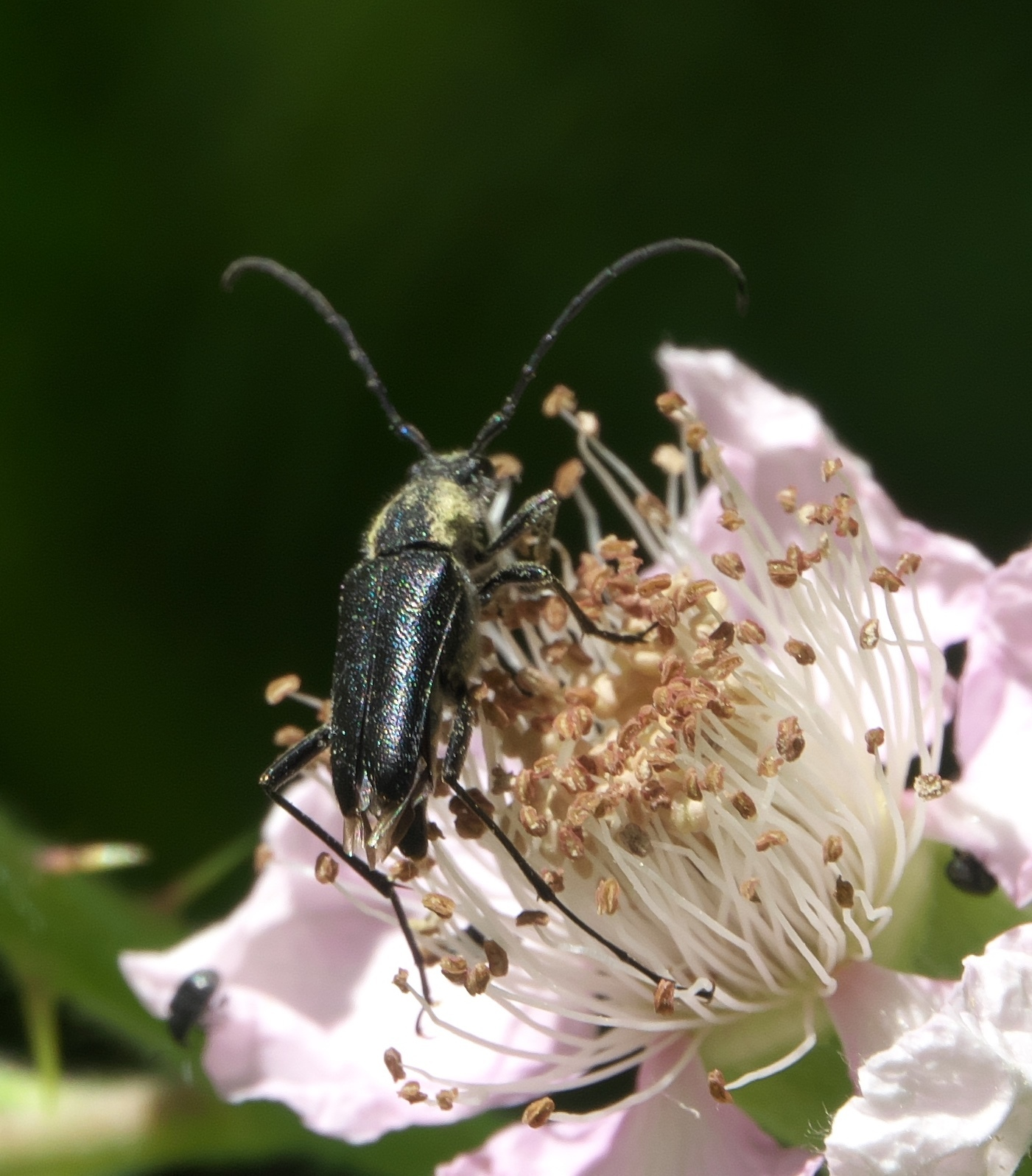
Male Anastrangalia laetifica, Oregon

Anastrangalia laetifica, the dimorphic flower longhorn, is a species of beetle from family Cerambycidae found in Canada, United States, and Mexico. The male elytras are all black, while the females have 4 black dots on their red coloured elytra. They feed on Frasera albicaulis.
