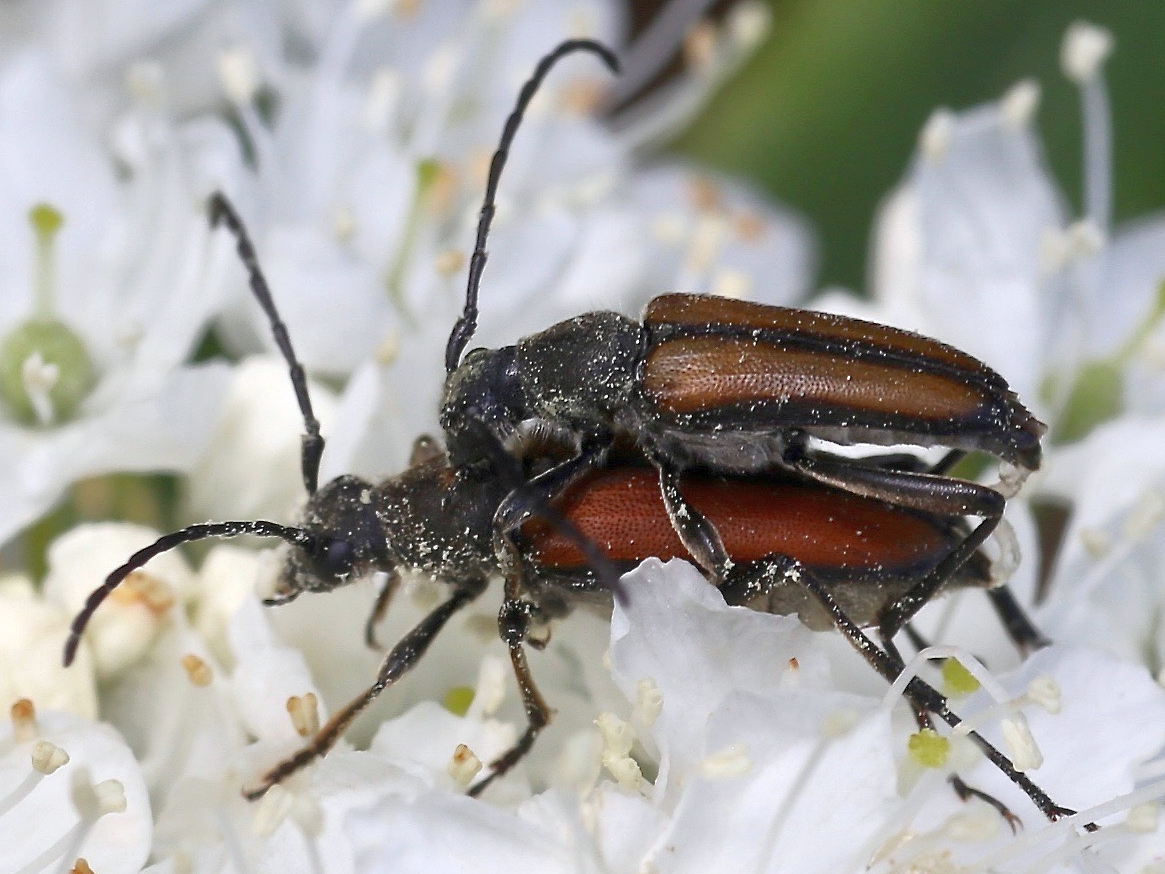
- Anastrangalia reyi sequensi

Scientific classification
- Domain: Eukaryota
- Kingdom: Animalia
- Phylum: Arthropoda
- Class: Insecta
- Order: Coleoptera
- Suborder: Polyphaga
- Infraorder: Cucujiformia
- Family: Cerambycidae
- Genus: Anastrangalia
- Species: A. reyi

Binomial name
- Anastrangalia reyi (Heyden, 1889)

Synonyms
- Corymbia (Anastrangalia) reyi (Heyden) Pesarini & Sabbadini, 1994; Leptura dubia var. ochracea Rey, 1885 nec Faust, 1878; Leptura dubia var. reyi Heyden, 1889

= Anastrangalia reyi =

Species of beetle

Anastrangalia reyi is a species of beetle from family Cerambycidae found in such European countries as Austria, Belarus, Czech Republic, Finland, France, Germany, Italy, Liechtenstein, Norway, Poland, Russia, Slovakia, Sweden, Ukraine, and the Baltic states. The species could also be found in Asian countries such as China, Japan, Kazakhstan, and Mongolia.

== Subspecies ==
- Anastrangalia reyi reyi (Heyden, 1889)
- Anastrangalia reyi sequensi (Reitter, 1898)
