= Apatophysis montana =

Scientific classification
- Kingdom: Animalia
- Phylum: Arthropoda
- Class: Insecta
- Order: Coleoptera
- Suborder: Polyphaga
- Infraorder: Cucujiformia
- Family: Cerambycidae
- Genus: Apatophysis
- Species: A. montana

Binomial name
- Apatophysis montana Gahan, 1906

Species of beetle

Apatophysis montana is a species of beetle in the family Cerambycidae, in the subgenus Protapatophysis.
