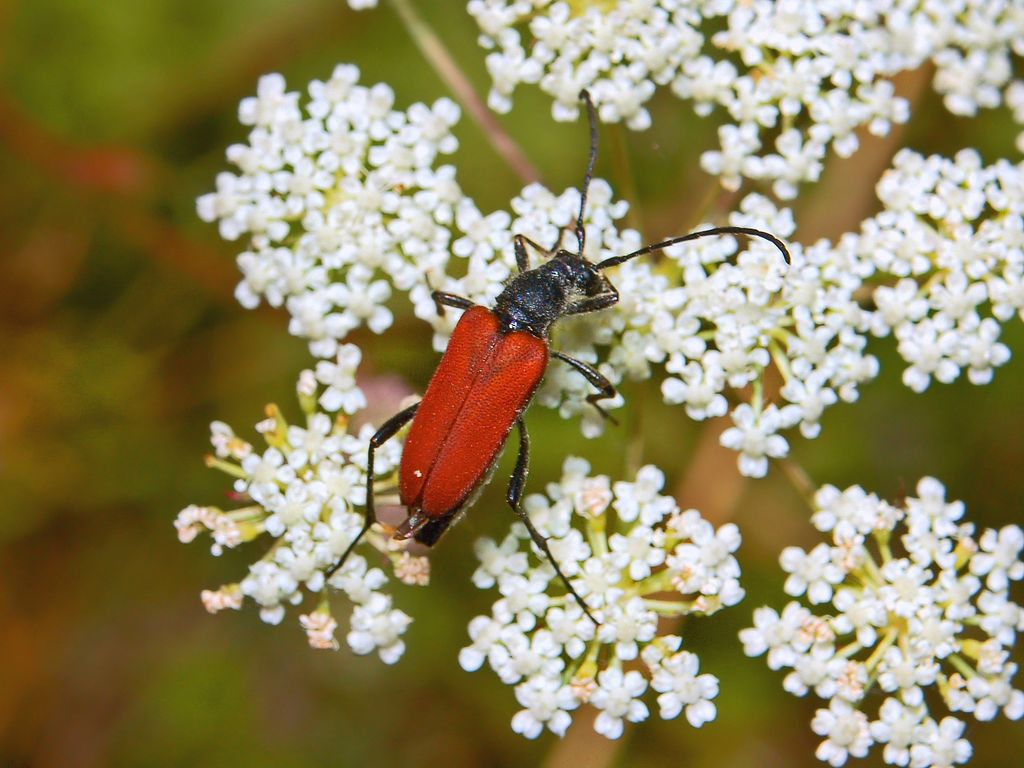

Scientific classification
- Kingdom: Animalia
- Phylum: Arthropoda
- Clade: Pancrustacea
- Class: Insecta
- Order: Coleoptera
- Suborder: Polyphaga
- Infraorder: Cucujiformia
- Family: Cerambycidae
- Genus: Anastrangalia
- Species: A. sanguinolenta

Binomial name
- Anastrangalia sanguinolenta (Linnaeus, 1761)

Synonyms
- Anastrangalia sandoeensis (Palm); Corymbia sanguinolenta (Pesarini & Sabbadini, 1994); Leptura bonaeriensis (Burmeister, 1865); Anastrangalia sandoeensis (Palm); Leptura ignita (Geoffroy, 1785); Leptura melanura (Stroem, 1765 nec Linnaeus, 1758); Leptura sandoeensis (Palm, 1953); Leptura sanguinolenta (Linnaeus, 1761); Leptura variabilis (DeGeer, 1775); Marthaleptura sanguinolenta Ohbayashi, 1963); Ophiostomis bonariensis (Burmeister, Bruch, 1912)

= Anastrangalia sanguinolenta =

Species of beetle

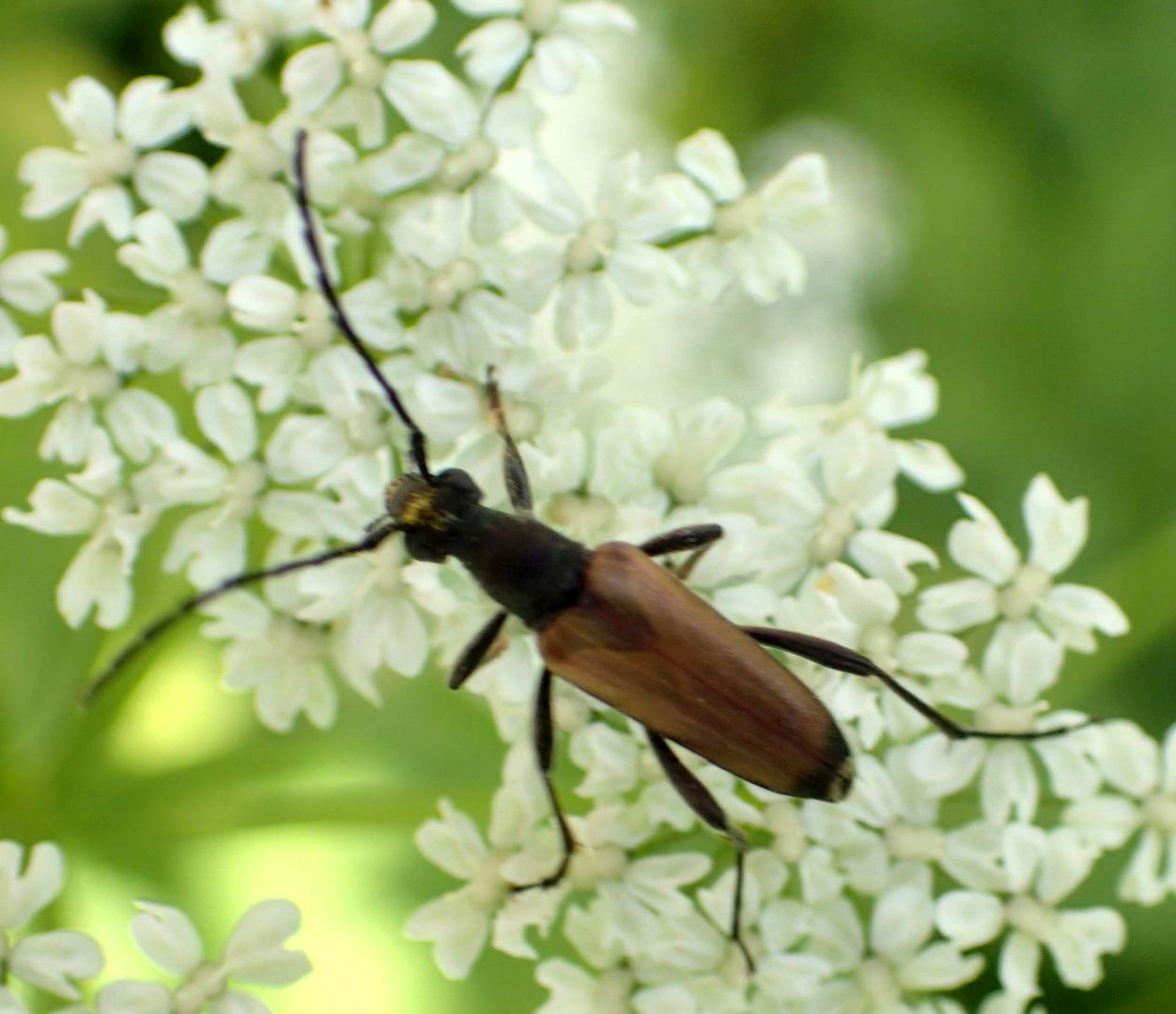
Anastrangalia sanguinolenta male

Anastrangalia sanguinolenta, the blood-red longhorn beetle, is a species of flower longhorn beetles belonging to the family Cerambycidae, subfamily Lepturinae.

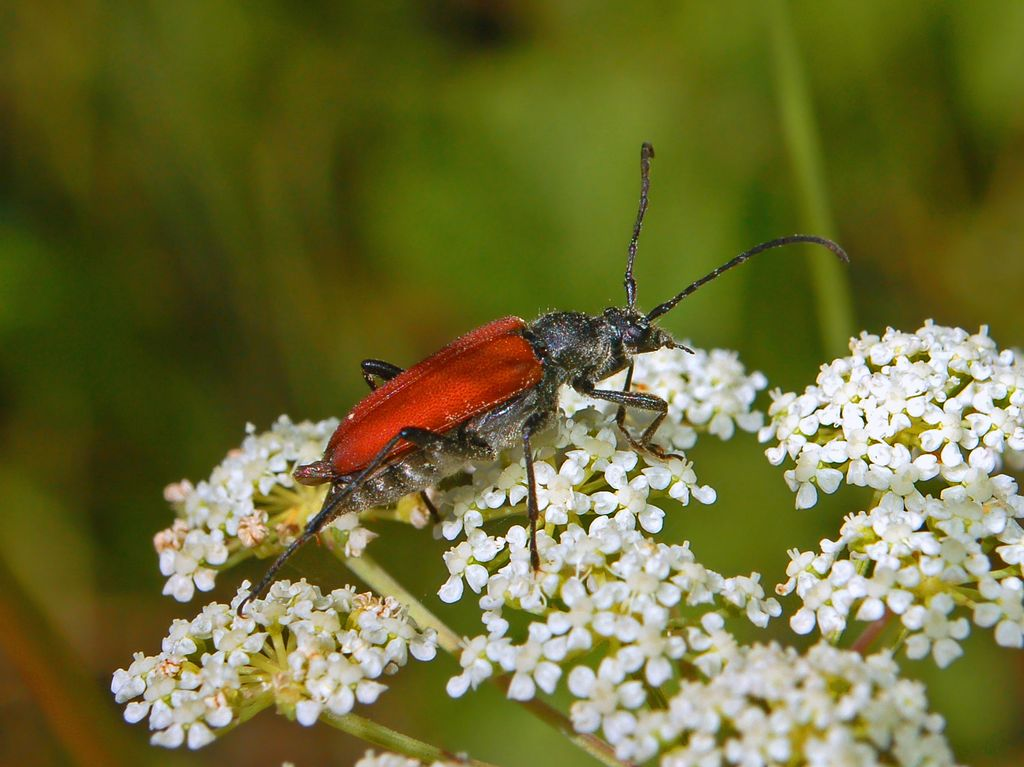
Anastrangalia sanguinolenta female

This beetle is a common species present in most of Europe and in the Near Eastern countries such as Caucasus, Transcaucasia, and Turkey, where they mainly inhabit mountainous coniferous forests.

Head, antennae and pronotum are black in both sexes, while elytra are reddish-brown in the female and yellowish-brown in the male.

The adults grow up to 8–13 millimetres (0.31–0.51 in) and can be encountered from May through August, completing their life cycle in 2–3 years.

The larvae develop at the expense of various species of conifers, mainly within dead wood of Pinus sylvestris and Picea abies. The adults visit flowers for nectar and pollen.
