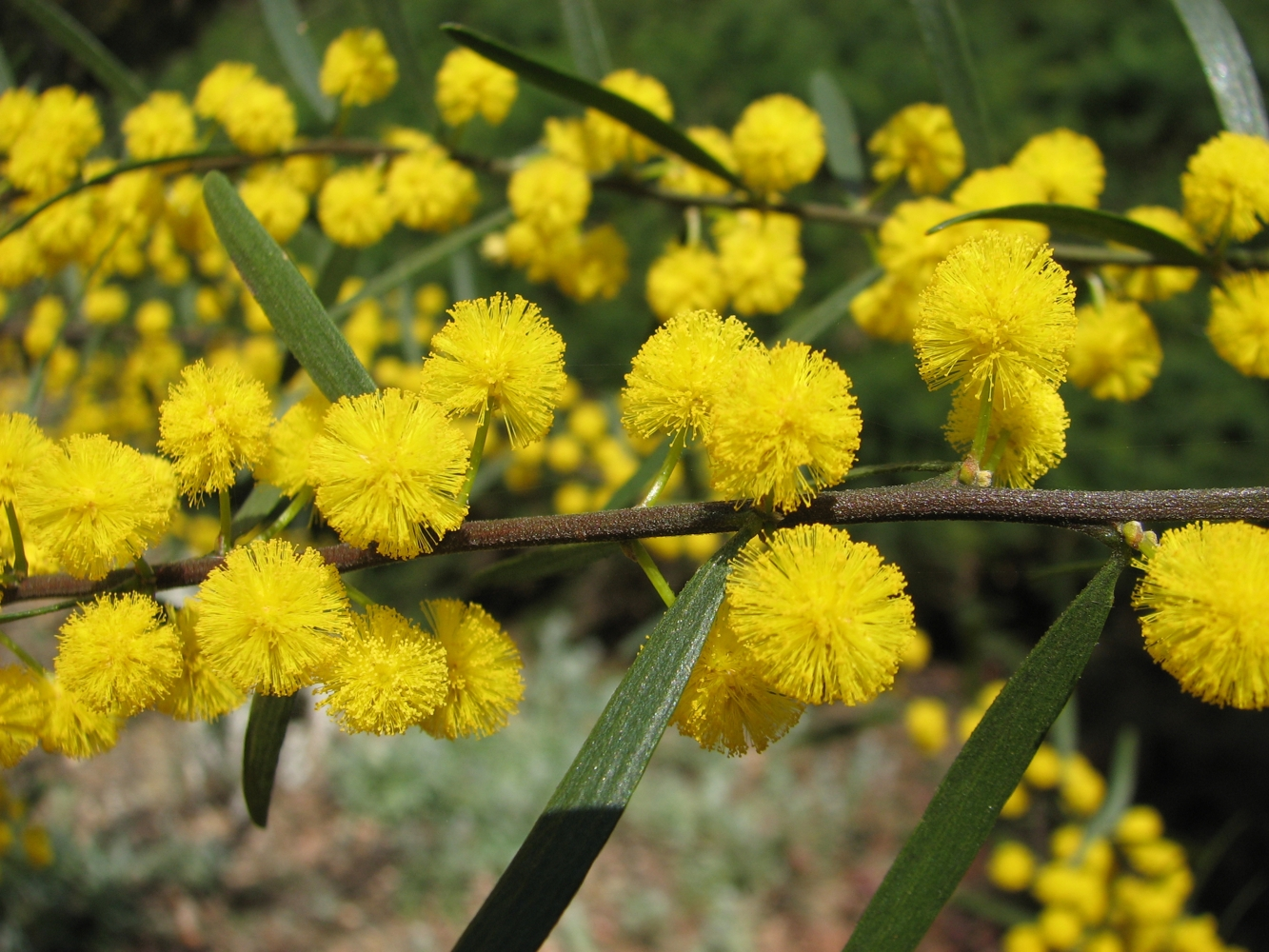
- In Maranoa Botanic Gardens

Scientific classification
- Kingdom: Plantae
- Clade: Tracheophytes
- Clade: Angiosperms
- Clade: Eudicots
- Clade: Rosids
- Order: Fabales
- Family: Fabaceae
- Subfamily: Caesalpinioideae
- Clade: Mimosoid clade
- Genus: Acacia
- Species: A. montana

Binomial name
- Acacia montana Benth.
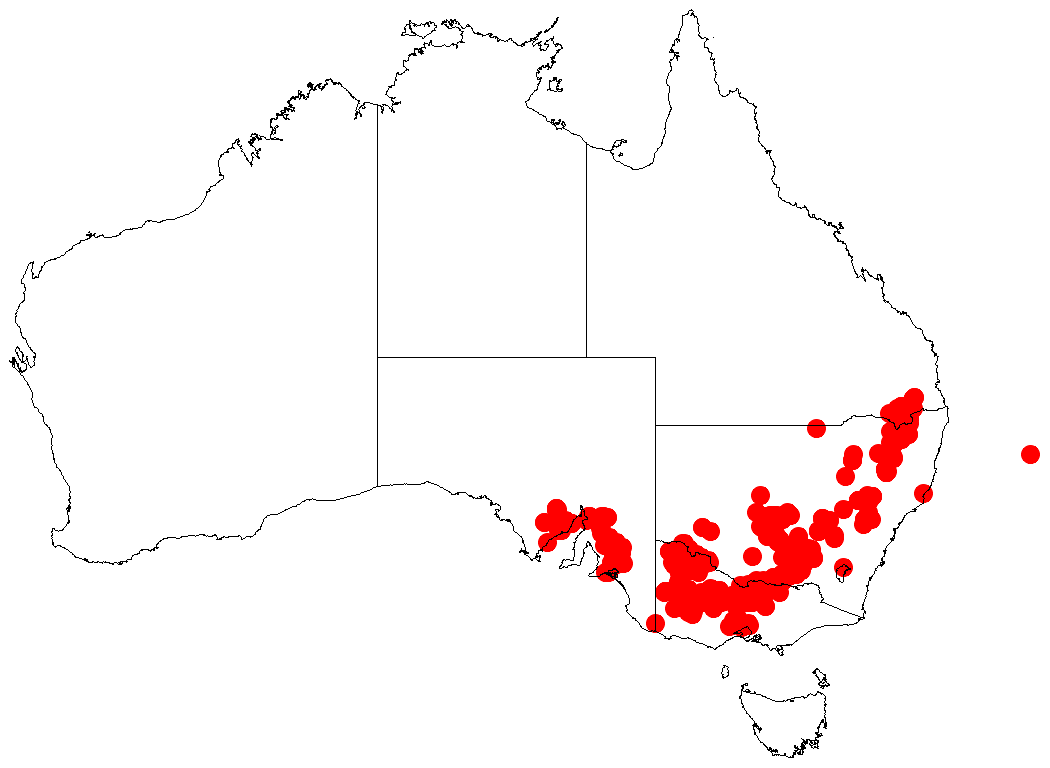
- Occurrence data from AVH

Synonyms
- Acacia clavata Schltdl.; Acacia montana Benth. var. montana; Acacia montana var. psilocarpa J.H.Willis; Racosperma montanum (Benth.) Pedley

= Acacia montana =

Species of plant

Acacia montana, commonly known as mallee wattle, is a species of flowering plant in the family Fabaceae, and is endemic to south-eastern mainland Australia. It is an erect or spreading shrub with fissured grey bark and resinous branchlets angled towards the outer end, straight, narrowly oblong to linear to narrowly elliptic phyllodes, spherical heads of bright yellow flowers, and straight to strongly curved or twisted pods raised over the seeds.

== Description ==
Acacia montana is an erect or spreading shrub, that typically grows to a height of 0.5–3.5 m (1 ft 8 in – 11 ft 6 in) with fissured grey bark, and resinous branchlets angled towards the outer edge and densely hairy or glabrous. Its phyllodes are more or less straight, narrowly oblong to linear or narrowlyt elliptic, sometimes lance-shaped with the narrower end towards the base, 10–45 mm (0.39–1.77 in) long, {cvt|1.5–7|mm}} wide, sparsely hairy with two main longitudinal veins and a rounded tip. There is a small gland at the base and tip of the phyllodes and the pulvinus is up to 2 mm (0.079 in) long. The flowers are borne in one or two spherical heads in axils on peduncles 3–10 mm (0.12–0.39 in) long, each head with 20 to 30 bright yellow flowers. Flowering usually ocurs from August to November, and the pods are straight to strongly curved or loosely twisted or coild, 10–50 mm (0.39–1.97 in) long, 3–4 mm (0.12–0.16 in) wide, leathery to firmly papery and brittle, and raised over the seeds. The seeds are oblong 3–4 mm (0.12–0.16 in) long, more or less shiny dark brown with a folded, cup-shaped aril on the end of the seed.

== Taxonomy ==
Acacia montana was first formally described in Hooker's London Journal of Botany from specimens collected near the Liverpool Plains by Charles Fraser. The specific epithet (montana) means 'pertaining to a mountain", although it occurs more widely on the slopes and plains.

== Distribution and habitat ==
Mallee wattle occurs in south-eastern mainland Australia from the Eyre Peninsula in South Australia through Victoria and New South Wales to near Stanthorpe in Queensland, and is most common on the inland slopes of the Great Dividing Range and adjacent plains in New South Wales and Victoria.

== See also ==
- List of Acacia species
