= Anastrangalia montana =

Scientific classification
- Domain: Eukaryota
- Kingdom: Animalia
- Phylum: Arthropoda
- Class: Insecta
- Order: Coleoptera
- Suborder: Polyphaga
- Infraorder: Cucujiformia
- Family: Cerambycidae
- Genus: Anastrangalia
- Species: A. montana

Binomial name
- Anastrangalia montana (Mulsant & Rey, 1863)

Synonyms
- Corymbia (Anastrangalia) montana (Mulsant & Rey) Pesarini & Sabbadini, 1994; Leptura montana Mulsant & Rey, 1863

Species of beetle

Anastrangalia montana is a species of beetle from family Cerambycidae, that could be found on Crete and Cyprus, in Greece, and in Asian countries like Syria and Turkey. The species, just like their other members of the family, have brown coloured pronotum (males), and black (females).
