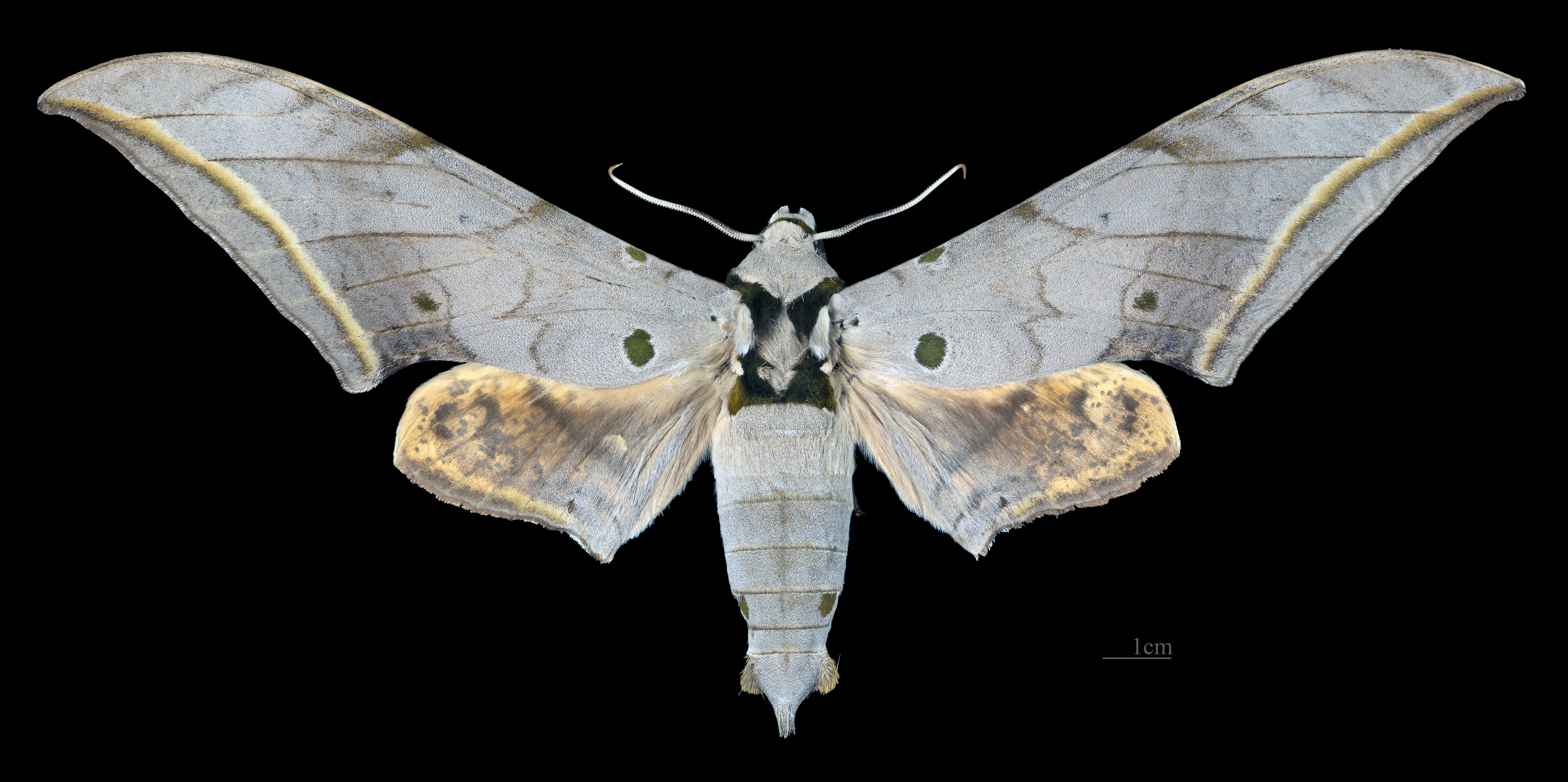
- Ambulyx montana Male dorsal
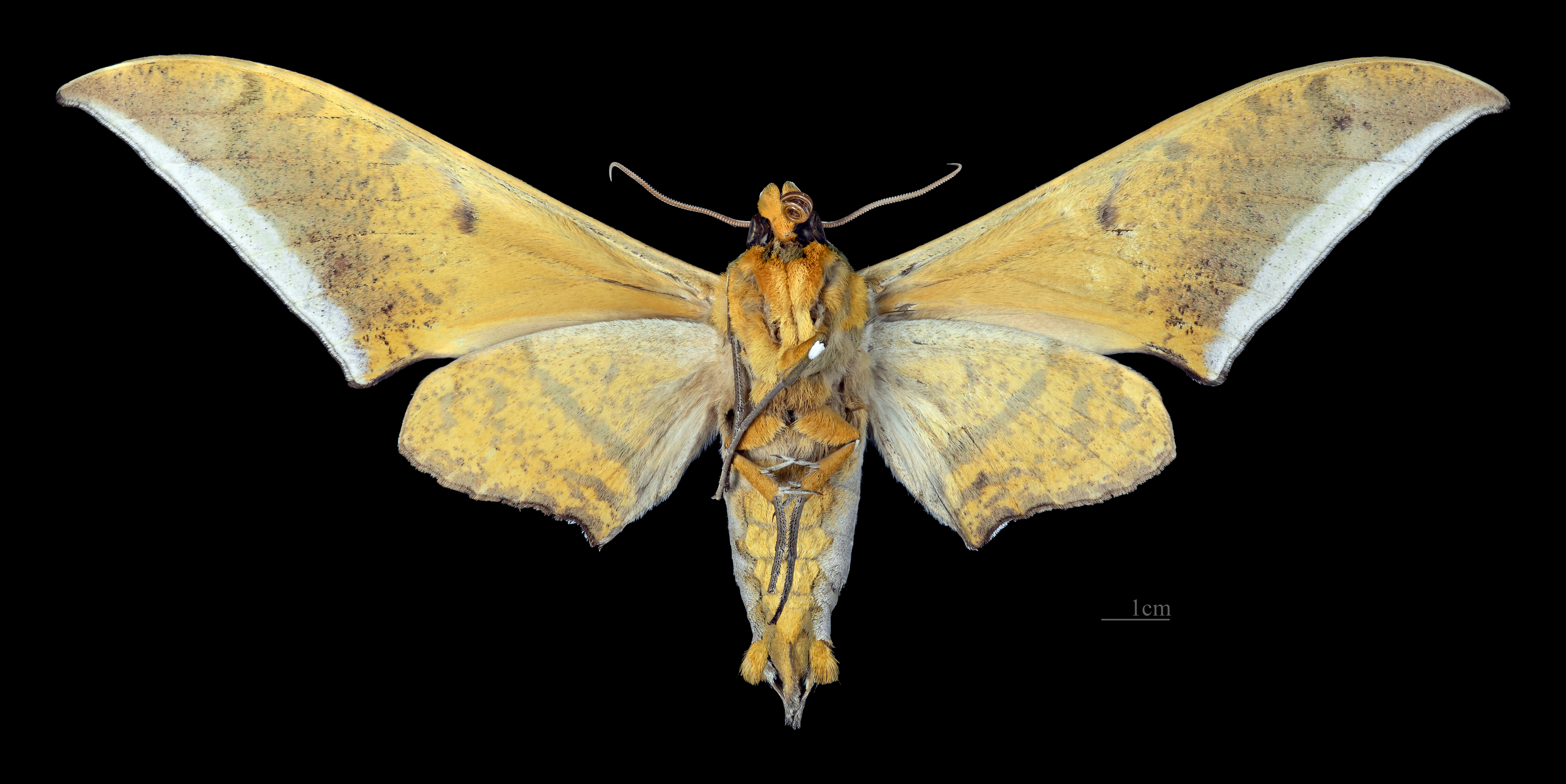
- Ambulyx montana Male ventral

Scientific classification
- Kingdom: Animalia
- Phylum: Arthropoda
- Clade: Pancrustacea
- Class: Insecta
- Order: Lepidoptera
- Family: Sphingidae
- Genus: Ambulyx
- Species: A. montana

Binomial name
- Ambulyx montana Cadiou & Kitching, 1990

= Ambulyx montana =

Species of moth

Ambulyx montana is a species of moth of the family Sphingidae. It is known from Thailand, Vietnam and Burma.
