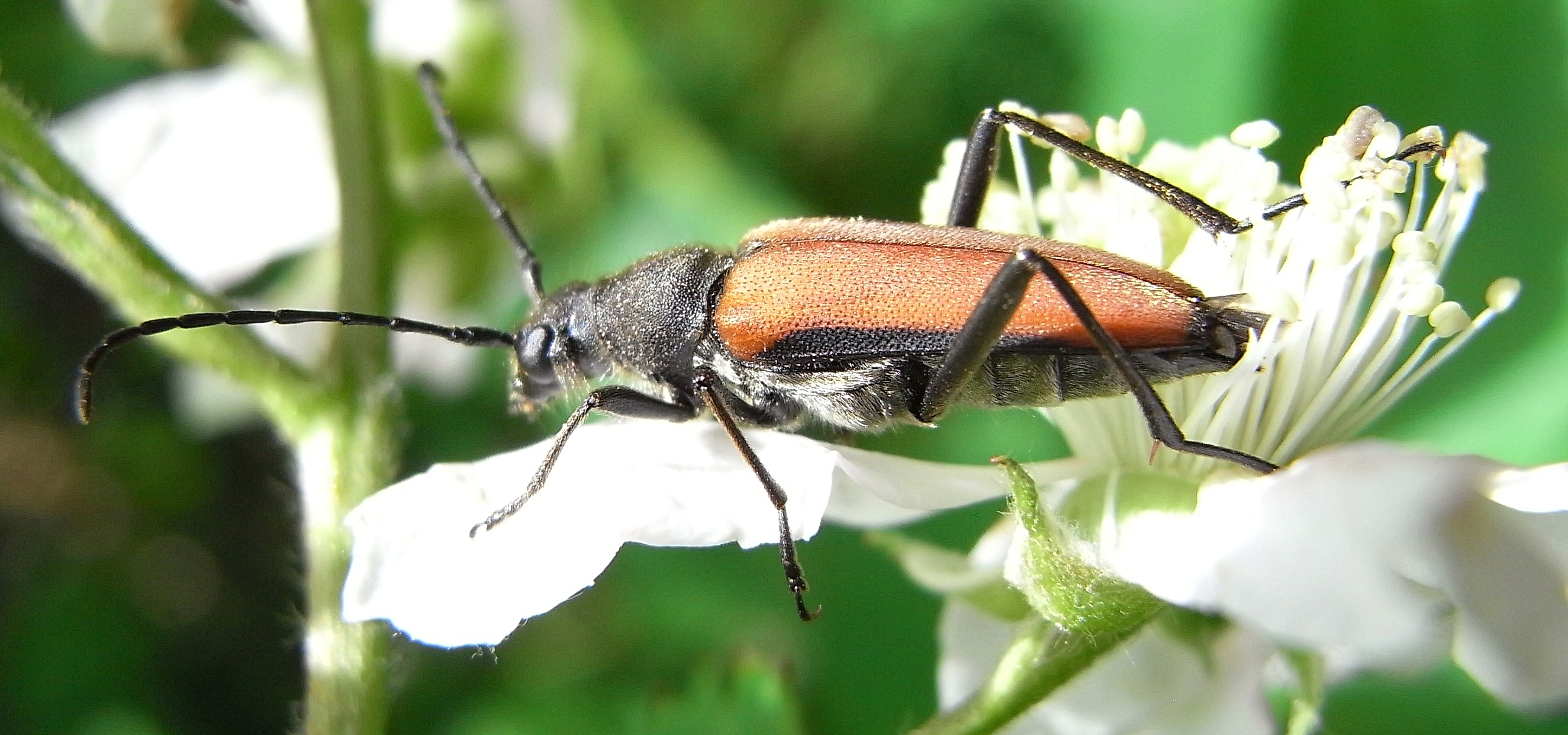
- Anastrangalia dubia

Scientific classification
- Domain: Eukaryota
- Kingdom: Animalia
- Phylum: Arthropoda
- Class: Insecta
- Order: Coleoptera
- Suborder: Polyphaga
- Infraorder: Cucujiformia
- Family: Cerambycidae
- Subfamily: Lepturinae
- Tribe: Lepturini
- Genus: Anastrangalia

= Anastrangalia =

Genus of beetles

Anastrangalia is a genus of beetle in the family Cerambycidae, containing the following species:

- Anastrangalia dissimilis (Casey, 1891)
- Anastrangalia dubia (Scopoli, 1763)
- Anastrangalia haldemani (Casey, 1891)
- Anastrangalia kasaharai (Makihara, 2002)
- Anastrangalia laetifica (LeConte, 1859)
- Anastrangalia montana (Mulsant & Rey, 1863)
- Anastrangalia renardi (Gebler, 1848)
- Anastrangalia reyi (Heyden, 1889)
- Anastrangalia rubriola (Bates, 1878)
- Anastrangalia sanguinea (LeConte, 1859)
- Anastrangalia sanguinolenta (Linnaeus, 1761)
- Anastrangalia scotodes (Bates, 1873)
