= Creamy Kate =

BPH38
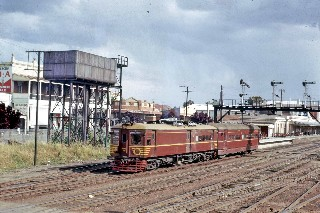
- Creamy Kate in Junee
- Manufacturer: New South Wales Government Railways
- Built at: Eveleigh Carriage Workshops
- Constructed: 1934
- Entered service: 1934–1983
- Number built: 1
- Fleet numbers: 38

Specifications
- Car length: 16.76 m (54 ft 11 7/8 in)
- Width: 2,920 mm (9 ft 7 in)
- Height: 3,920 mm (12 ft 10 3/8 in)
- Prime mover(s): Leyland 1934-58); GM 6/71 diesel (1958-80)
- Engine type: Petrol 1934-58); Diesel (1958-80)
- Track gauge: 1,435 mm (4 ft 8 1/2 in) standard gauge

Creamy Kate is a former New South Wales Government Railways railmotor, numbered 38. It is an evolution of the CPH rail motor class.

== Overview ==
Between 1923 and 1930, the New South Wales Government Railways took delivery of 37 of the 42-Foot (CPH) rail motors and 5 similar 42-Foot trailers to replace locomotive-hauled passenger trains on lightly trafficked lines with a low patronage. With their popularity, patronage had increased beyond their normal operating capabilities and it had become clear that a larger and more powerful rail motor was needed.

The main problem standing in the way of development was finding a suitably sized internal combustion engine to power this larger vehicle. A larger engine with enough power would lower the power-to-weight ratio and consequently defeat the purpose of the Rail Motor. This meant that existing steam trains and Rail Motors would have to be alternated to meet service requirements.

A solution was found in building a rail motor with two engines in the form of a 150 hp (110 kW) 6-cylinder Leyland petrol engine and Lysholm-Smith hydraulic transmission. A similar vehicle had been built in 1933 by the Northern Counties Committee (Northern Ireland) division of the London Midland and Scottish Railway and proved successful.

The Rail and Road Motor Engineer, NE Stafford supervised the building of these new vehicles in the Eveleigh Carriage Workshops and rail motor CHP 38 emerged from the workshops in June 1934. Externally it was similar to the 42-foot (12.80 m) rail motors, but was considerably longer at 55-foot (16.76 m).

It was nicknamed Creamy Kate after being released in a livery of cream with blue lining. A matching trailer carriage, CT 81, was built to the same size and design as No.38 on the underframe of passenger carriage BX 1048 that had been damaged in an accident at Bowning.

The pair were allocated to Dubbo for use on services to Orange, Molong and Coonamble. In 1938, the second class seating was removed and the area converted to accommodate 7.5 tons of luggage and the vehicle was recoded BPH. In 1949, BPH 38 was reallocated to Narrandera where it operated with 400 class rail motors on services to Hay and Tocumwal connecting with the Riverina Express. In 1958 the Leyland petrol engines were replaced with GM 6/71 diesel engines.

The vehicle was again converted in 1967 when the first class area was recoded to second class and the toilet that was located adjacent to the driver at the front of the car was moved into the passenger compartment, removing a significant blind spot and the vehicle was recoded FPH. In the 1970s, FPH 38 was reallocated to Werris Creek to operate services on the Barraba line from Tamworth connecting with the Northern Mail and Northern Tablelands Express. It returned to Narrandera, back to Werris Creek, back to Narrandera and finally to Cowra where it operated services to Harden to connect with the Riverina Express and South Mail.

With the replacement of many branch line services by road coaches, CHP 38 became surplus to requirements and was condemned in April 1983 and sold to the Dorrigo Steam Railway & Museum.

Meanwhile, trailer CT 81 was renumbered 551 in 1945. It was sent to Sutherland in 1958 and modified to operate with CPH rail motors on the Sutherland to Helensburgh services on the Illawarra railway line. Following the electrification of the line to Waterfall in July 1980, it was stored, then condemned in April 1983 and sold to the Dorrigo Steam Railway & Museum.
