= New South Wales 400/500 class railmotor =

400/500 Class rail motors
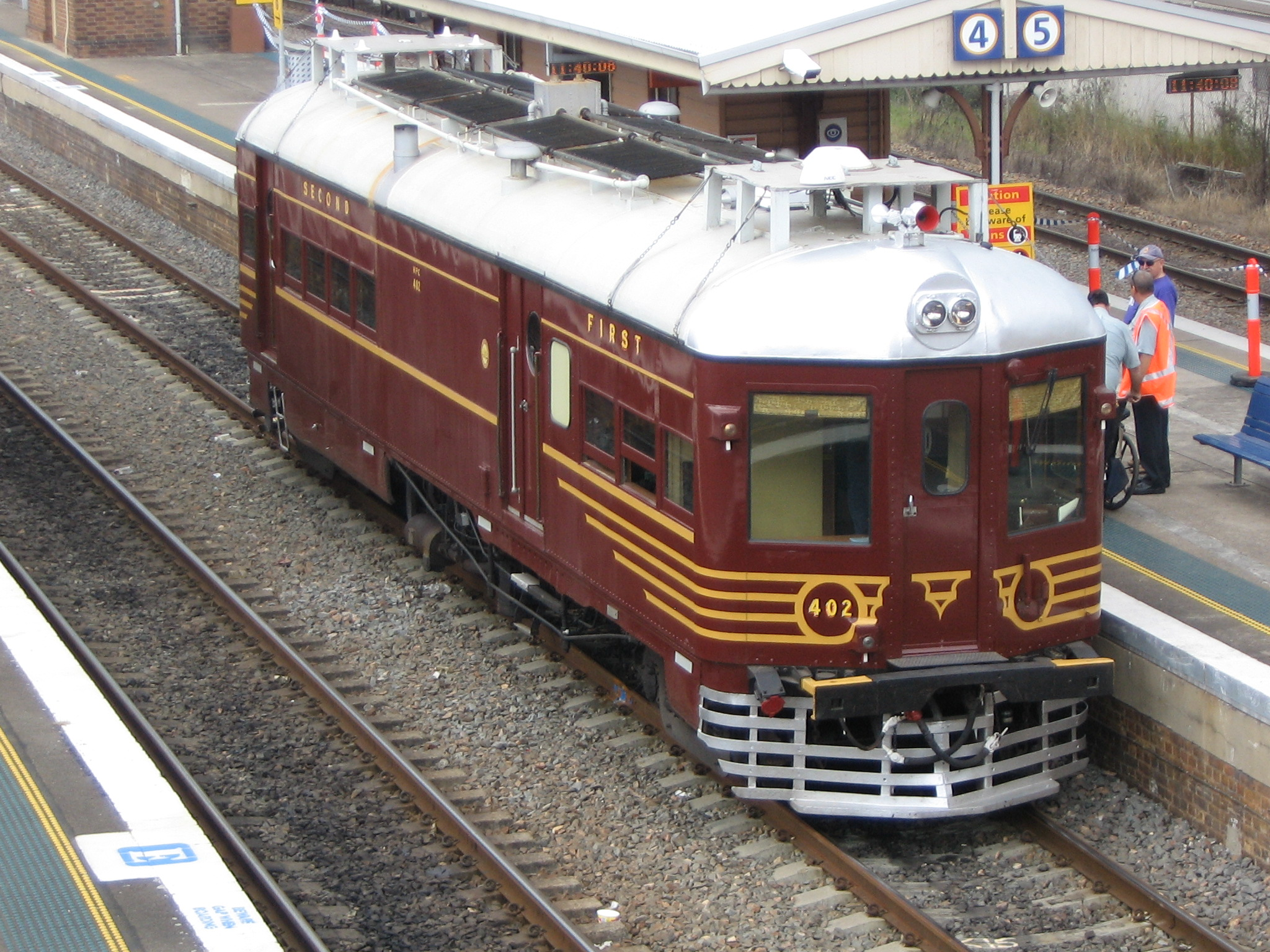
- HPC 402 at Maitland in April 2009

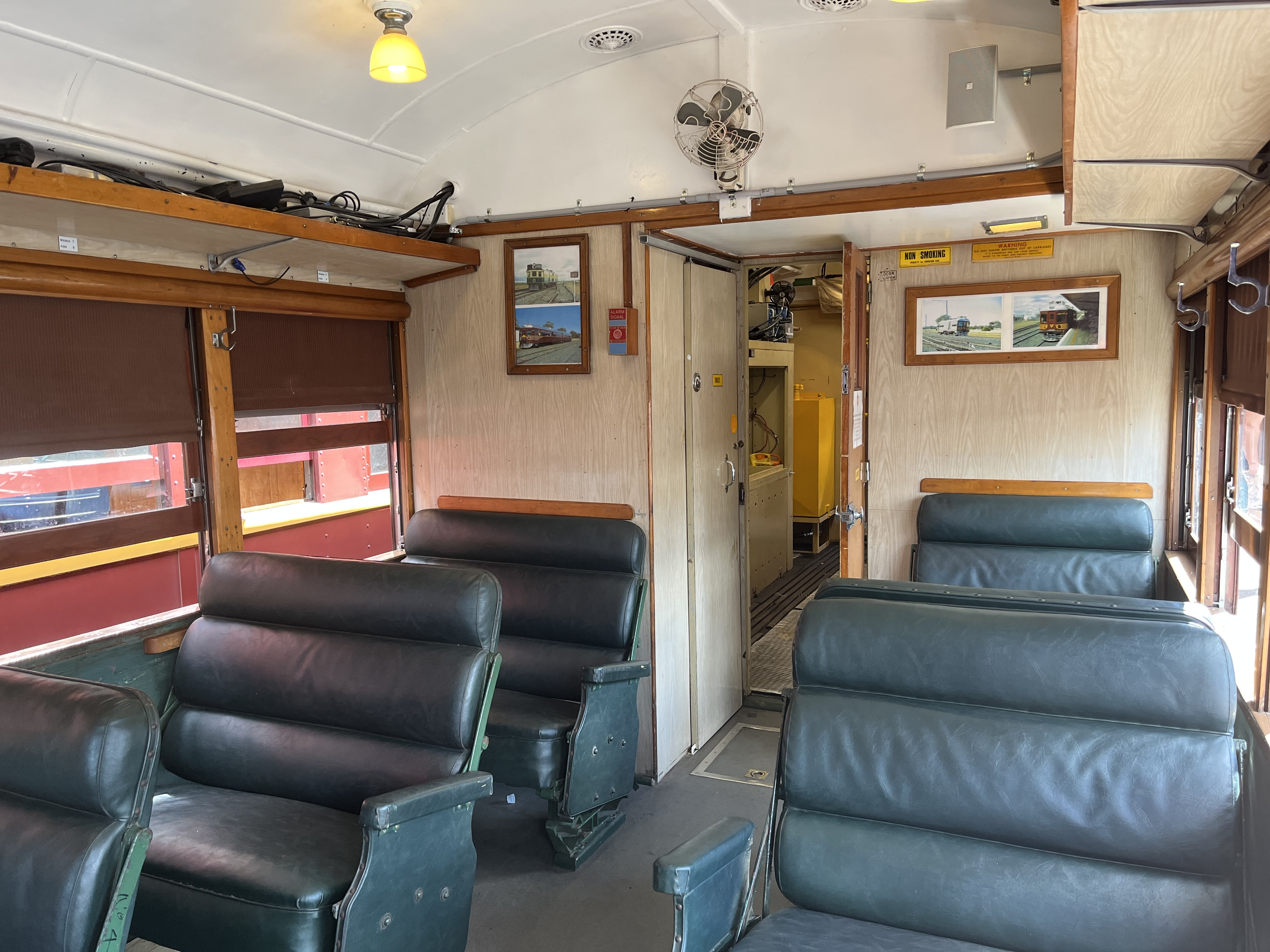
- Interior
- Manufacturers: New South Wales Government Railways; Ritchie Brothers
- Built at: Eveleigh Carriage Workshops; Auburn
- Constructed: 1938
- Entered service: 1938 to 1983
- Number built: 12 (4 power cars and 8 trailer cars)
- Fleet numbers: 401–404 & 501–508
- Operator: New South Wales Government Railways

Specifications
- Car body construction: Steel (power cars) and steel and aluminium (trailer cars)
- Car length: 15.55 m (51 ft 1/4 in) power cars; 16.76 m (54 ft 11 7/8 in) trailer cars
- Width: 2,870 mm (9 ft 5 in)
- Height: 3,790 mm (12 ft 5 1/4 in)
- Maximum speed: 100 km/h (62 mph)
- Traction system: Diesel hydraulic
- Prime movers: Two Leyland 6-cylinder petrol (150 hp or 110 kW); Two GM Detroit Diesel 6/71
- Engine type: 6-cylinder diesels
- Power output: 300 hp (220 kW) (150 hp or 110 kW x 2)
- Transmission: Lysholm-Smith torque converter; Twin Disc torque converter
- Braking systems: S.E.M. straight air with emergency feature, handbrake
- Track gauge: 1,435 mm (4 ft 8 1/2 in) standard gauge

The 400/500 class rail motors are diesel trains built by New South Wales Government Railways primarily for use on regional lines throughout NSW. The trains have since been phased out following a rationalisation of country branch line rail services in November 1983. The 400 Class power cars were built in 1938 at the Eveleigh Carriage Workshops, while the 500 Class trailer cars were built by Ritchie Brothers at Auburn.

== Power Cars ==
The 400 Class power cars followed the same general lines as the Silver City Comet powers vans, although they were slightly shorter in length at 15.55 metres (51 ft 0 in). They were fitted with two underfloor 150 horsepower (110 kW) Leyland in-line six-cylinder, petrol engines coupled to Leyland Lysholm-Smith hydraulic transmissions. This was a repeat of the installation used in the earlier Rail Motor No.38. No multiple unit capability was provided. Each power car was capable of hauling one or two trailer cars. The mechanical equipment was mounted underfloor and a passenger compartment seating 19 Second Class passengers was provided at one end while the other was occupied by a large luggage compartment with a capacity of 4 tonnes (3.9 long tons; 4.4 short tons).

FPH 404 was destroyed by fire at Narrandera in 1944. The remaining three were re-engined with diesel engines between 1953 and 1957. They were fitted with two 150 horsepower GM Detroit Diesel 6/71 in-line six-cylinder, diesel engines and Twin Disc hydraulic torque converter transmissions.

When built, the power cars had a toilet located in the front opposite the driver and the front window was covered by a metal plate which gave the driver limited vision at level crossings. The cars had a 'one-eyed' appearance and this earned them the nickname 'Lord Nelson'. The toilet was later moved to the rear of the passenger compartment and replaced by passenger seating.

FPH 402 was modified in 1972 with the installation of a compartment seating eight First Class passengers and a toilet at the opposite end to the main passenger compartment and coded HPC. It was planned to extend this modification to 401 and 403 but with the decline in passenger numbers, it was considered too expensive to be repeated. The others simply had four seats in the main compartment allocated to First Class.

With the decline in branch line patronage, the use of trailers became rare and some were reassigned to Sydney for suburban working, while those remaining in the country received little use.

== Trailer Cars ==
The 500 Class trailer cars were the same as those used on the Silver City Comet except that air-conditioning was not provided. The cars had two basic configurations, a composite sitting car (CT 501-504 and 506) and a Second Class sitting car (FT 505, 507 and 508). These last three were stored on completion in 1938 and finally entered service between 1941 and 1944. The trailer cars were initially delivered from the builder with Comet trailer numbers (213-220) but were renumbered into the 500 series before entering service. FT 505 was sent to Sydney to work with 42-Foot rail motors in 1951. The end doors were sealed and CPH operating equipment fitted. From 1951 onwards 501, 502, 504, 507 and 508 were fitted with a luggage compartment and recoded as HCT. FT 506 and HCT 501 were later sent to Sydney and modified to work with CPH rail motors along the same lines as FT 505.

== Deployment ==
Two units were initially deployed to Dubbo for working to Coonamble, Molong and Gwabegar and two to Narranderra for working services to Junee, Tocumwal, Hay and Hillston. The Dubbo-based units were transferred Narrandera in the early 1940s and along with Rail Motor No.38 worked the southern branches until the 1970s. The three surviving 400 Class and No.38 were then transferred to north west with units being based at Werris Creek, Narrabri and Moree, where they remained until their retirement in November 1983.

== Radio Test Car ==
HPC 402, along with trailer FT 501, were purchased by the Rail Motor Society, Paterson in 1984. In August 1986 HPC 402 was leased back to the State Rail Authority and after an overhaul used as a radio system test unit operating across NSW. Initially leased for six months, it would not be until July 2000 that it was returned to the Society after travelling some 200,000 kilometres. It has continued to see regular main line use, often being hired by rail infrastructure owners as a route learner, a radio test car or for executive inspections. In 2013, 402 performed such duties on the Benalla to Oaklands in Victoria after the line was converted from broad to standard gauge by the Australian Rail Track Corporation.

== Preservation ==
FT 503 was damaged by fire and scrapped in 1944. The surviving 400 and 500 Class were all withdrawn in November 1983. FT 505 and 506 were scrapped and HCT 507 was disposed of privately, while the remainder were offered for sale. Trailers HCT 504 and 508 and reprieved from the sale and were converted to parcel trailers for the Silver City Comet. They were painted in the Comet's distinctive silver and blue livery and recoded PT. They were withdrawn with the other Comet vehicles in 1989. HPC 401 and 403 and trailer CT 503 are preserved at the Dorrigo Steam Railway & Museum, while HPC 402 and trailer FT 501 are preserved in the collection of the Rail Motor Society. HPC 402 is the sole unit remaining in operational condition and continues to provide services to rail infrastructure owners as well as tourist operations.
