= Bundure =

- Town
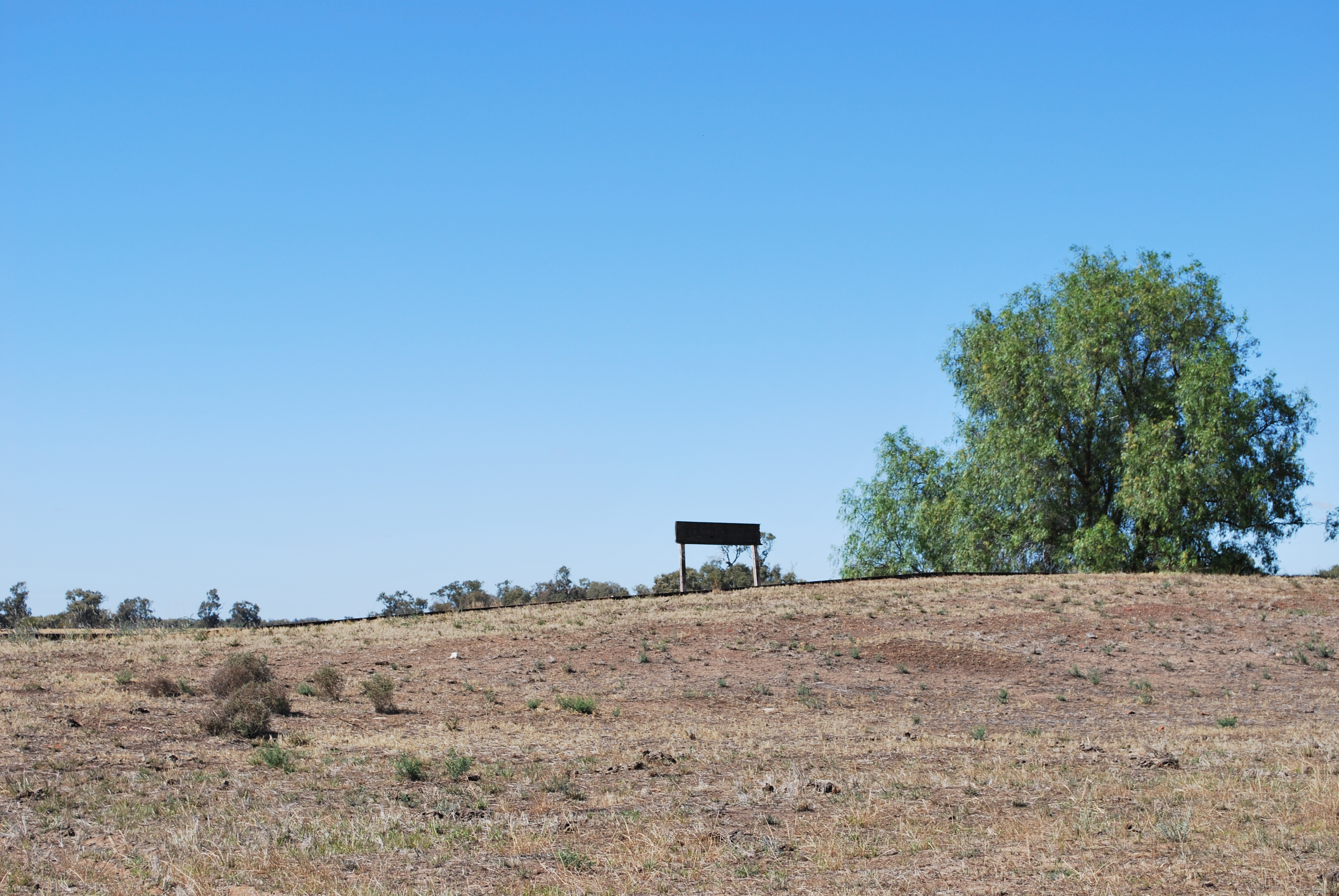
- Disused rail siding at Bundure

- Coordinates: 35°10′S 146°00′E
- Country: Australia
- State: New South Wales
- LGA: Murrumbidgee Council
- Location: 623 km (387 mi) SW of Sydney; 141 km (88 mi) S of Griffith; 33 km (21 mi) NE of Jerilderie; 25 km (16 mi) NE of Widgiewa; 43 km (27 mi) S of Coleambally

Government
  - State electorate: Albury
  - Federal division: Farrer
- Elevation: 109 m (358 ft)

Population
  - Total: 274 (2006 census)
- Postcode: 2663
- County: Urana

Bundure is a rural community in the central south part of the Riverina. It is situated by road, about 25 kilometres south west of Widgiewa and 33 kilometres north east of Jerilderie. In 2006, Bundure had a population of 274 people.

The place name Bundure is derived from the local Aboriginal word Bundoora meaning "place of meeting of many Kangaroos".

Bundure Post Office opened on 1 September 1926, was closed between 1930 and 1934, and finally closed in 1973.
