= Widgiewa, New South Wales =

Widgiewa
- Town
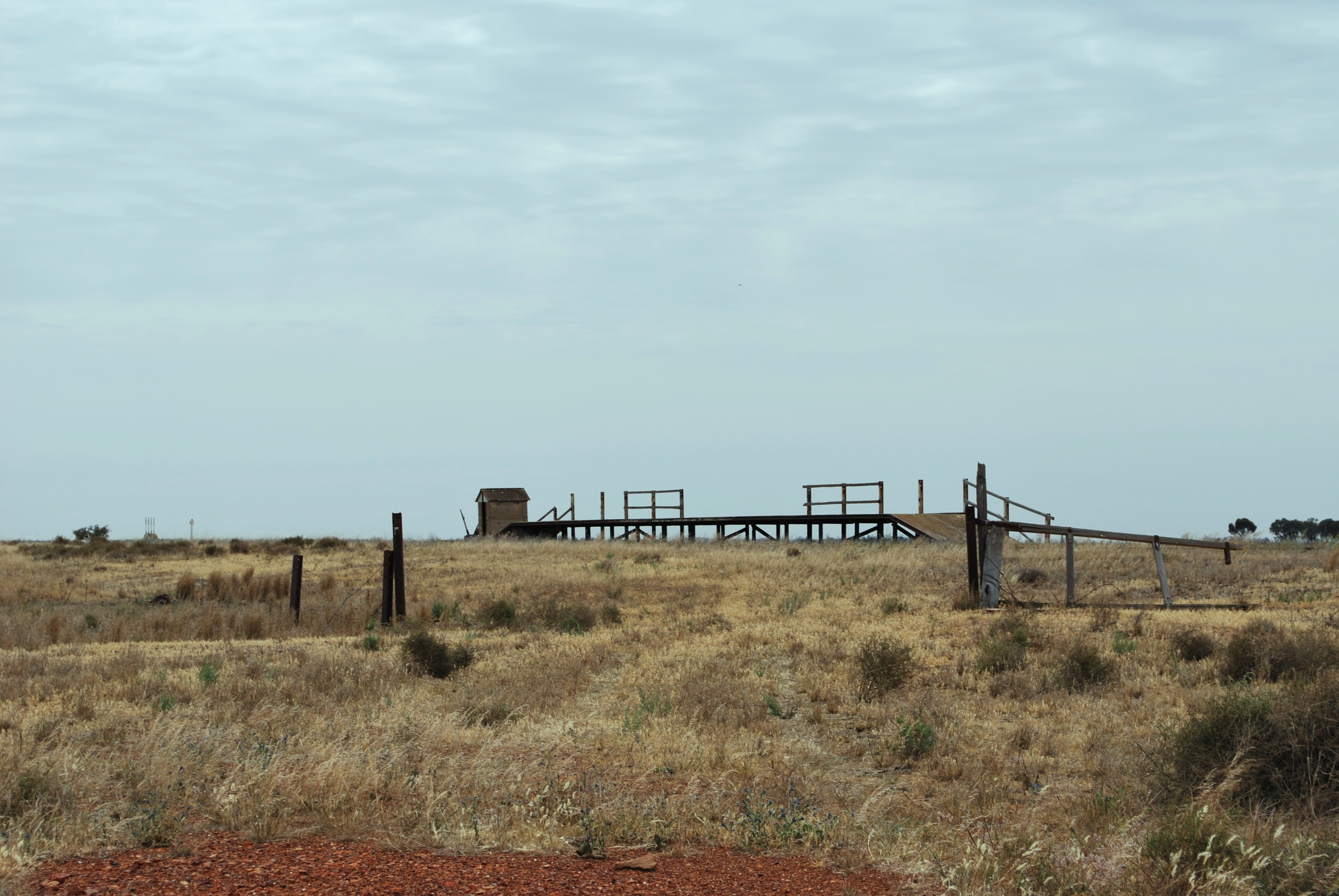
- Abandoned rail siding at Widgiewa

- Coordinates: 35°02′39″S 146°11′50″E
- Country: Australia
- State: New South Wales
- LGA: Federation Council
- Location: 9 km (5.6 mi) from Morundah; 25 km (16 mi) from Bundure

Government
  - State electorate: Albury
  - Federal division: Farrer
- Elevation: 112 m (367 ft)
- Postcode: 2700
- County: Urana

Widgiewa is a small community in the central part of the Riverina in New South Wales, Australia.

== Geography ==
Widgiewa is situated by road, about 9 kilometres (5.6 mi) south west of Morundah and 25 kilometres (16 mi) north east of Bundure.

== History ==
The place name Widgiewa is derived from the local Aboriginal word meaning "What do you want?".

Widgiewa was a station on the Tocumwal railway line. The station opened on 16 September 1884 and closed on 4 May 1975.

Widgiewa Post Office opened on 15 March 1912 and closed in 1970.
