= Mairjimmy, New South Wales =

Mairjimmy New South Wales
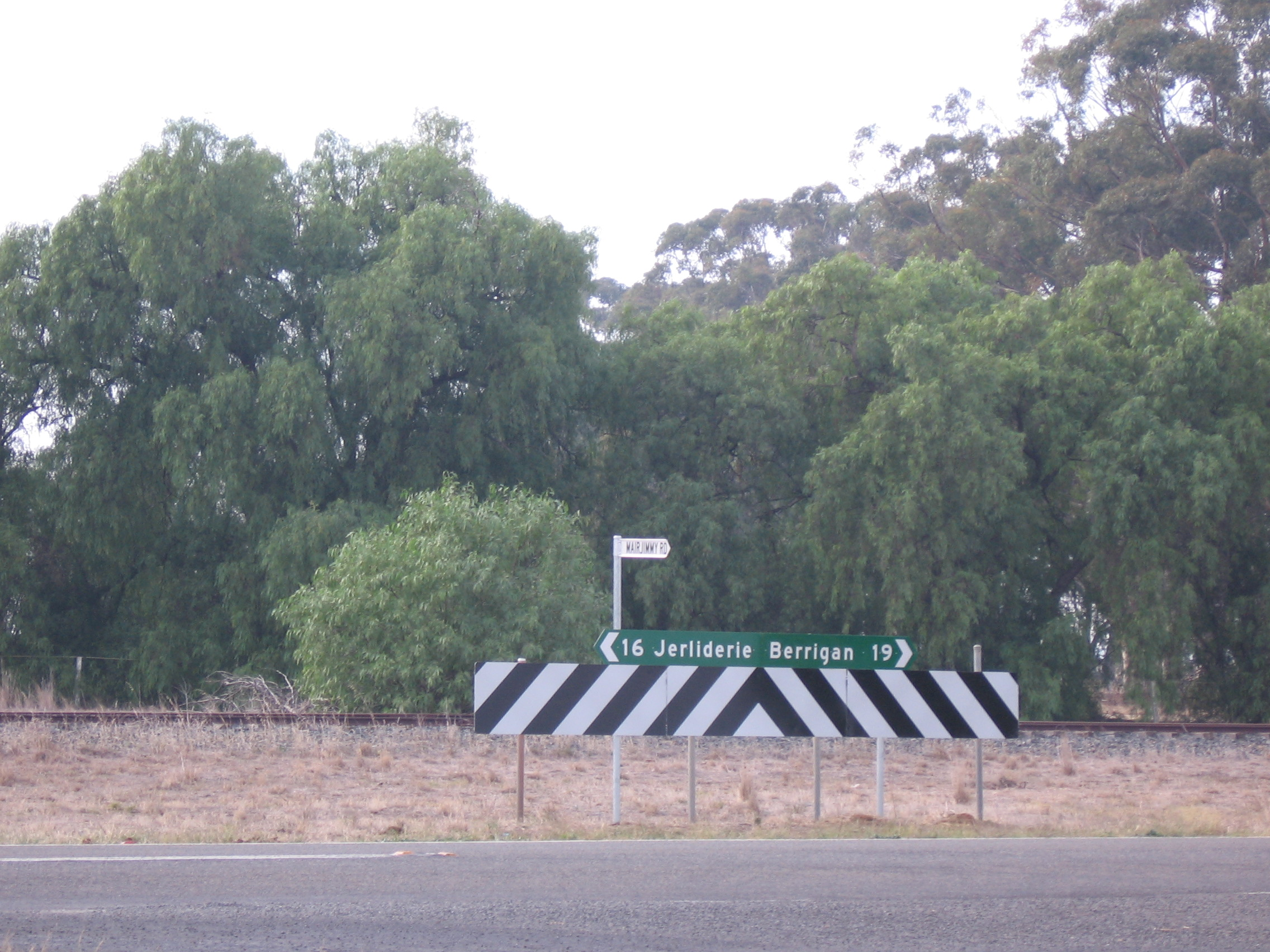
- Intersection near former rail siding

- Coordinates: 35°29′36″S 145°44′36″E
- Population: 37 (SAL 2021)
- Postcode(s): 2712
- Elevation: 114 m (374 ft)
- Location: 17 km (11 mi) from Jeriliderie; 20 km (12 mi) from Berrigan
- LGA(s): Murrumbidgee Council
- County: Urana
- State electorate(s): Albury
- Federal division(s): Farrer

Mairjimmy is a rural community in the central south part of the Riverina. It is situated by road, about 17 kilometres south east of Jerilderie and 20 kilometres north west of Berrigan.

Mairjimmy Football Club entered the Southern Riverina Football Association for one season only in 1917.
