= Caladenia rileyi =

Gillenbah spider orchid

Scientific classification
- Kingdom: Plantae
- Clade: Tracheophytes
- Clade: Angiosperms
- Clade: Monocots
- Order: Asparagales
- Family: Orchidaceae
- Subfamily: Orchidoideae
- Tribe: Diurideae
- Genus: Caladenia
- Species: C. rileyi

Binomial name
- Caladenia rileyi D.L.Jones

Synonyms
- Arachnorchis rileyi (D.L.Jones) D.L.Jones & M.A.Clem.

Species of orchid

Caladenia rileyi, commonly known as the Gillenbah spider orchid, is a plant in the orchid family Orchidaceae and is endemic to New South Wales. It is a ground orchid with a single leaf and a single yellowish-green and red flower.

== Description ==
Caladenia rileyi is a terrestrial, perennial, deciduous, herb with an underground tuber and a single leaf, 40–100 mm (2–4 in) long and 6–8 mm (0.2–0.3 in) wide. A single yellowish-green and red flower is borne on a spike 80–250 mm (3–10 in) tall. The sepals and petals have thick, brownish, club-like glandular tips 6–25 mm (0.2–1 in) long. The dorsal sepal is erect, 40–55 mm (1.6–2.2 in) long and 2–3 mm (0.08–0.1 in) wide. The lateral sepals are 40–55 mm (1.6–2.2 in) long, 3–4 mm (0.12–0.16 in) wide and are parallel to each other and held below horizontal. The petals are 30–40 mm (1–2 in) long, about 2 mm (0.08 in) wide and also turned slightly downwards. The labellum is 17–20 mm (0.7–0.8 in) long and 18–20 mm (0.7–0.8 in) wide and greenish-white with a dark red tip. The sides of the labellum turn upwards and have between four and six teeth up to 6 mm (0.2 in) long. The tip of the labellum curls downwards and there are four rows of crowded calli up to 3 mm (0.1 in) long, along its mid-line. Flowering occurs from September to October.

== Taxonomy and naming ==
Caladenia rileyi was first formally described in 1997 by David Jones and the description was published in The Orchadian from a specimen collected in the Gillenbah State Forest near Narrandera.

== Distribution and habitat ==
The Gillenbah spider orchid grows in Callitris woodland between Narrandera and Jerilderie on the south-west slopes of New South Wales.
