= Osborne, New South Wales =

Osborne
- Town
- Coordinates: 35°22′S 146°43′E
- Country: Australia
- State: New South Wales
- LGA: Lockhart Shire
- Location: 15 km (9.3 mi) from Lockhart; 19 km (12 mi) from Woodend

Government
  - State electorate: Wagga Wagga
- Elevation: 137 m (449 ft)

Population
  - Total: 32 (2021)
- Postcode: 2656
- County: Urana

Osborne is a village community in the central-eastern part of the Riverina. It is situated about 15 kilometres south of Lockhart and 19 kilometres (12 mi) west from Woodend by road.

Gumholes Post Office opened on 1 September 1900. It was renamed Osborne in 1902 and remained in operation until its closure in 1951.

== Sport and recreation ==
Osborne Football / Netball Club

The Osborne Football Club was first established in 1900 as the Napier South FC. The new community around Gum Holes Creek came together and organised a social game of football against Lockhart. The team, called ‘Napier South’ and nicknamed as "The Gumholes", played its matches on cleared land at Freser's farm near the present-day Uniting Church. An early match against a Lockhart team ended with Napier South scoring one goal.

In 1915, the Gum Holes School was renamed Osborne. When the football club reformed after the war in 1919, it became Osborne Football Club.

=== Football competitions ===
- Napier South FC (1901–1918)
  - 1901 & 1902: Line Association. Premiers – 1902
  - 1903: Drought. Club in recess.
  - 1904: Milbrulong Football Association. Premiers – 1904
  - 1905–1913: Lockhart Football Association. Premiers – 1905, 1908, 1911.
  - 1906: Greengunyah Football Association
  - 1914–1918: Club in recess due to World War One.
- Osborne FC (1919–2024)
  - 1919–1920: Urageline Football Association. Premiers – 1919
  - 1922: Pleasant Hills & District Football Association. Premiers – 1922
  - 1923–1926: Urageline Football Association. Premiers – 1923, 1924, 1925, 1926.
  - 1927 & 1928: Osborne & District Football Association. Premiers – 1927. Runners Up – 1928.
  - 1929 - Lockhart & District Lines Football Association. Premiers – 1929
  - 1930–1939: The Rock & District Football Association. Premiers – 1937, 1938 – Drawn grand final, 1938 - Grand final replay
  - 1940: Lockhart & District Football Association. Premiers – 1940.
  - 1941–1944: Club in recess due to World War Two.
  - 1945–1948: Milbrulong & District Football League. Runners Up – 1945, 1946, 1947.
  - 1949–1969: Central Riverina Football League. Premiers – 1950, 1957, 1958, 1961. Runners Up – 1951, 1955.
  - 1970–2024: Hume Football League. Premiers – 1985, 1991, 1992, 1994, 1995, 1998, 1999, 2000, 2001, 2005, 2006, 2009, 2012, 2017, 2019, 2023, 2024, 2025. Runners Up – 1993, 1997, 2002, 2004, 2007, 2008.

== See also ==
- Australian rules football in New South Wales
- Australian rules football in the Riverina
- Hume Football League
