= Tocumwal railway line =

Tocumwal railway line may refer to:

- Tocumwal railway line, New South Wales, the New South Wales Government Railways route closed in 1988
- Tocumwal railway line, Victoria, the Victorian Railways route from Seymour railway station
