= Urangeline East, New South Wales =

Urangeline East New South Wales
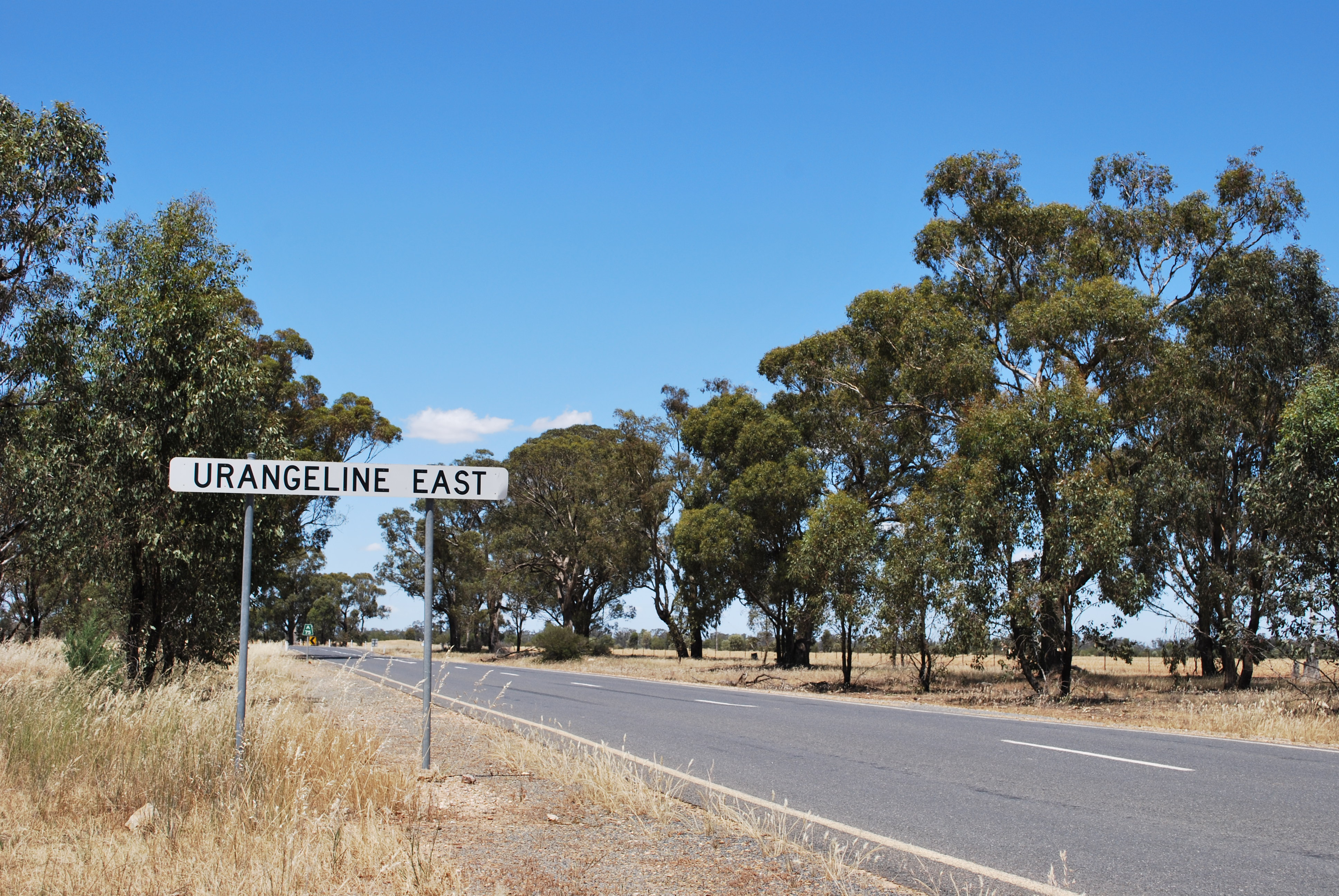
- Sign

- Coordinates: 35°28′58″S 146°41′39″E
- Population: 37 (SAL 2021)
- Postcode(s): 2656
- Elevation: 151 m (495 ft)
- Location: 9 km (6 mi) from Urangeline; 19 km (12 mi) from Bidgeemia
- County: Urana
- State electorate(s): Wagga Wagga

Urangeline East is a rural community in the central part of the Riverina. It is situated by road, about 9 kilometres southeast from Urangeline and 19 kilometres east from Bidgeemia.

Bendabo Post Office opened on 1 November 1928, was renamed Urangeline East in 1930 and closed in 1971.

It was serviced by the Rand branch railway line before the line was closed in 1975.
