= Corobimilla, New South Wales =

Corobimilla New South Wales
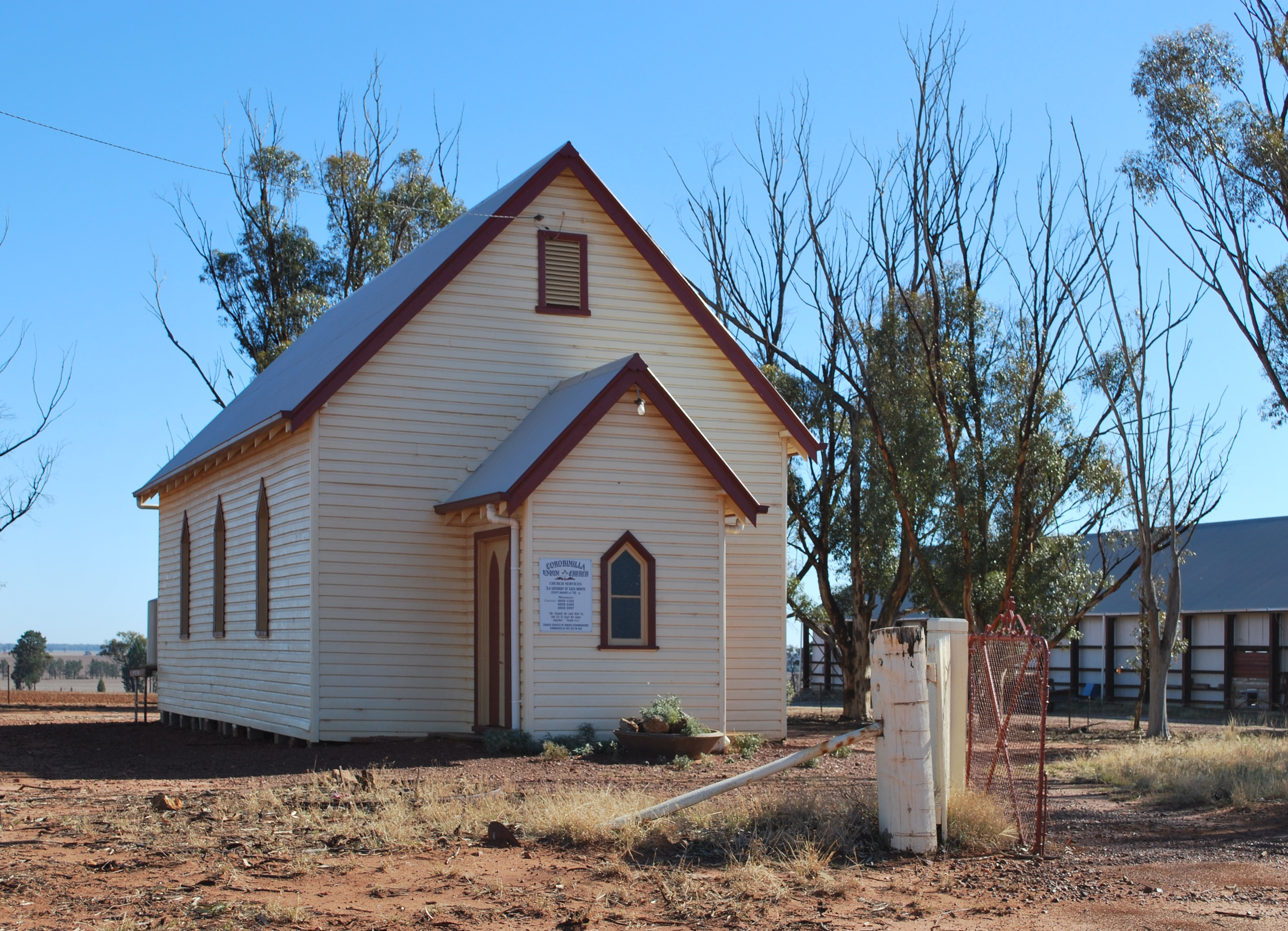
- Union Church

- Coordinates: 34°51′S 146°25′E
- Population: 44 (SAL 2021)
- Postcode(s): 2700
- Location: 12 km (7 mi) from Morundah; 20 km (12 mi) from Narrandera
- LGA(s): Narrandera Shire
- County: Mitchell
- State electorate(s): Cootamundra
- Federal division(s): Farrer

Corobimilla is a village locality in the central east part of the Riverina. It is situated by road, about 12 kilometres northeast of Morundah and 20 kilometres south west of Narrandera.

The place name Corobimilla is derived from the local Aboriginal word meaning "tree struck by lightning".

Cuddell Siding Post Office opened on 1 August 1895, was renamed Corobimilla in 1904, and closed in 1988.
