= Jeithi people =

Indigenous Australian people

The Jeithi were an indigenous Australian people of the state of New South Wales.

== Country ==
The Jeithi people lived in an area, characterized by eucalyptus woodland interspersed with stands of native pine, between the Murray River and south-southwest of Wagga Wagga, estimated by Norman Tindale to cover some 5,000 square miles (13,000 km^{2}). They ranged from the west of Tocumwal to near Howlong, their northern reaches extending to Lake Urana, Jerilderie and Lockhart. Their tribal lands took in areas of both the Yanko and Billabong creeks.

== Social organization ==
Little is known of the tribe, other than that they were composed of several clans with a moiety system.

== History of contact ==
Already at the time of earliest European penetration of their territory, the Jeithi were being displaced by pressure from the Wiradjuri on their territory to the east.

== Alternative names ==
- Yeidthee
- Pikkolatpan (Note: This may be the name of a horde, or an alternative name for the Victorian Kwatkwat.)

== Some words ==
- womboi (kangaroo)
- middi (tame dog)
- mama (father)
- gooni (mother)
- gooin (white man)

== Sources ==
- Gordon, G. A. (1887). "Deniliquin" (PDF). In Curr, Edward Micklethwaite (ed.). The Australian race: its origin, languages, customs, place of landing in Australia and the routes by which it spread itself over the continent. Vol. 3. Melbourne: J. Ferres. pp. 396–397.
- McLean, Lachlan (1887). "Yanko, Urana, Billabong, Jerriderie" (PDF). In Curr, Edward Micklethwaite (ed.). The Australian race: its origin, languages, customs, place of landing in Australia and the routes by which it spread itself ver the continent. Vol. 3. Melbourne: J. Ferres. pp. 394–395.
- Richards, C. (23 June 1902a). "Wirra Athoorie, Wirrai' Yarrai'. Wirrach' aree. Wirra' jerree". Science of Man. 5 (5): 81–83.
- Richards, C. (21 July 1902b). "Wirra Athoorie, Wirrai' Yarrai'. Wirrach' aree. Wirra' jerree". Science of Man. 5 (6): 98–102.
- Richards, C. (26 August 1902c). "Wirra-Dthoor-ree Wir-rai' Yarrai. Wir-rach'Ar-ree.' Wir-raì Jer-ree". Science of Man. 5 (7): 114–119.
- Richards, C. (23 September 1902d). "Wirra-Dthoor-ree Wir-rai' Yarrai. Wir-rach'Ar-ree.' Wir-raì Jer-ree". Science of Man. 5 (8): 133–138.
- Tindale, Norman Barnett (1974). "Jeithi (NSW)". Aboriginal Tribes of Australia: Their Terrain, Environmental Controls, Distribution, Limits, and Proper Names. Australian National University Press. ISBN 978-0-708-10741-6. Archived from the original on 25 February 2018.
