= Manilla railway underbridges =

- Coordinates: 30°38′51″S 150°39′25″E
- Carries: Tamworth-Barraba railway line
- Crosses: Borah Creek; Oakey Creek
- Locale: Manilla, Tamworth Regional Council, New South Wales, Australia
- Owner: Transport Asset Manager of New South Wales

Characteristics
- Design: Howe truss underbridges
- Material: Timber
- Pier construction: Concrete and timber
- Longest span: 10.4 metres (34 ft)
- No. of spans: 7

Rail characteristics
- No. of tracks: One
- Track gauge: 4 ft 8 1/2 in (1,435 mm) standard gauge

History
- Contracted lead designer: NSW Government Railways
- Constructed by: NSW Department of Public Works
- Construction end: 1908

New South Wales Heritage Register
- Official name: Manilla railway underbridges
- Type: State heritage (built)
- Designated: 2 April 1999
- Reference no.: 1045
- Type: Railway Bridges / Viaduct
- Category: Transport – Rail

Location
- Interactive map of Manilla railway underbridges

The Manilla railway underbridges are two heritage-listed railway bridges located on the Tamworth-Barraba railway line in the town of Manilla in the Tamworth Regional Council local government area of New South Wales, Australia. The underbridges are owned by Transport Asset Manager of New South Wales, an agency of the Government of New South Wales. The two sites were added to the New South Wales State Heritage Register on 2 April 1999.

== Description ==
The bridges includes two structures, one located at Upper Manilla across the Borah Creek; and the other across the Oakey Creek.

=== Bora Creek underbridge ===
The Borah Creek Bridge is a Howe timber truss railway underbridge located at Upper Manilla across the Borah Creek, situated 575 kilometres (357 mi) from Sydney Central station, erected in 1908. The bridge is seven spans in length, with the three central spans constructed with 10-metre (34 ft) span Howe-Deck timber trusses. The trestles are supported on concrete sills. Opened in 1908, it has three 10.4-metre (34 ft) timber truss spans and is a good example of the 9.8–10.7-metre (32–35 ft) deck Howe truss. This type of truss bridge was introduced in 1902 and used until 1908. Other examples are across the Murrumbidgee River at Gundagai (1905), and at Oakey Park, 17 kilometres (11 mi) north of the present bridge. The bridge is of considerable technological significance. The bridge carries a single-track 4 ft 8 1/2 in (1,435 mm) standard gauge railway on an open deck (with transoms). The spans are 4.3 metres (14 ft), three at 10.4 metres (34 ft), 6.7 metres (22 ft), and 4.3 metres (14 ft), of which the three larger spans are timber trusses and the other timber girders. The trusses are deck-type Howe trusses of the 9.8–10.7-metre (32–35 ft) deck-type, with timber compression diagonals, steel tie rods for the verticals and five bays. The piers are timber, with concrete bases. The bridge was listed on the (now defunct) Register of the National Estate on 18 April 1989.

=== Oakey Creek underbridge ===
The Oakey Creek Bridge is a Howe timber truss railway underbridge located at Upper Manilla across the Oakey Creek, situated 539 kilometres (335 mi) from Central station, also completed in 1908. The bridge is a significant technical accomplishment. It was opened in 1908 and has five 10.4-metre (34 ft) timber truss spans. It is a good example of the 9.8–10.7-metre (32–35 ft) deck type Howe truss, introduced in 1902 and used until 1908. Other examples are across the Murrumbidgee River at Gundagai (1903) and at Borah Creek, 17 kilometres (11 mi) south of the present bridge. The bridge carries a single-track 4 ft 8 1/2 in (1,435 mm) standard gauge railway on an open deck (with transomes). The spans are 7.3 metres (24 ft), five at 10.4 metres (34 ft) and 7.3 metres (24 ft), of which the five larger spans are timber trusses and the others timber girders. The trusses are deck type Howe trusses, of the 9.8–10.7-metre (32–35 ft) deck type, with five bays, timber compression diagonals and steel tie rods for the verticals. The piers are timber. The bridge was listed on the (now defunct) Register of the National Estate on 18 April 1989.

== Heritage listing ==
The bridges were constructed in timber because of the remote location and constraints on cost, particularly related to branch line construction. They are two of the relatively few surviving timber bridges left in the State and are of considerable significance.

The Manilla railway underbridges were listed on the New South Wales State Heritage Register on 2 April 1999 having satisfied the following criteria.

The place possesses uncommon, rare or endangered aspects of the cultural or natural history of New South Wales.

This item is assessed as historically rare. This item is assessed as scientifically rare. This item is assessed as archaeologically rare. This item is assessed as socially rare.

== See also ==
- Barraba railway line
- William Howe (architect)
