= Woodend, New South Wales =

Woodend
- Town
- Coordinates: 35°24′S 146°56′E
- Country: Australia
- State: New South Wales
- LGA: Lockhart Shire
- Location: 12 km (7.5 mi) from Yerong Creek; 23 km (14 mi) from Osborne

Government
  - State electorate: Wagga Wagga
- County: Mitchell

Woodend is a rural community in the central part of the Riverina about 14 kilometres north east of Pleasant Hills. It is situated by road, about 12 kilometres west from Yerong Creek and 23 kilometres east from Osborne.
