= Jerilderie railway station =

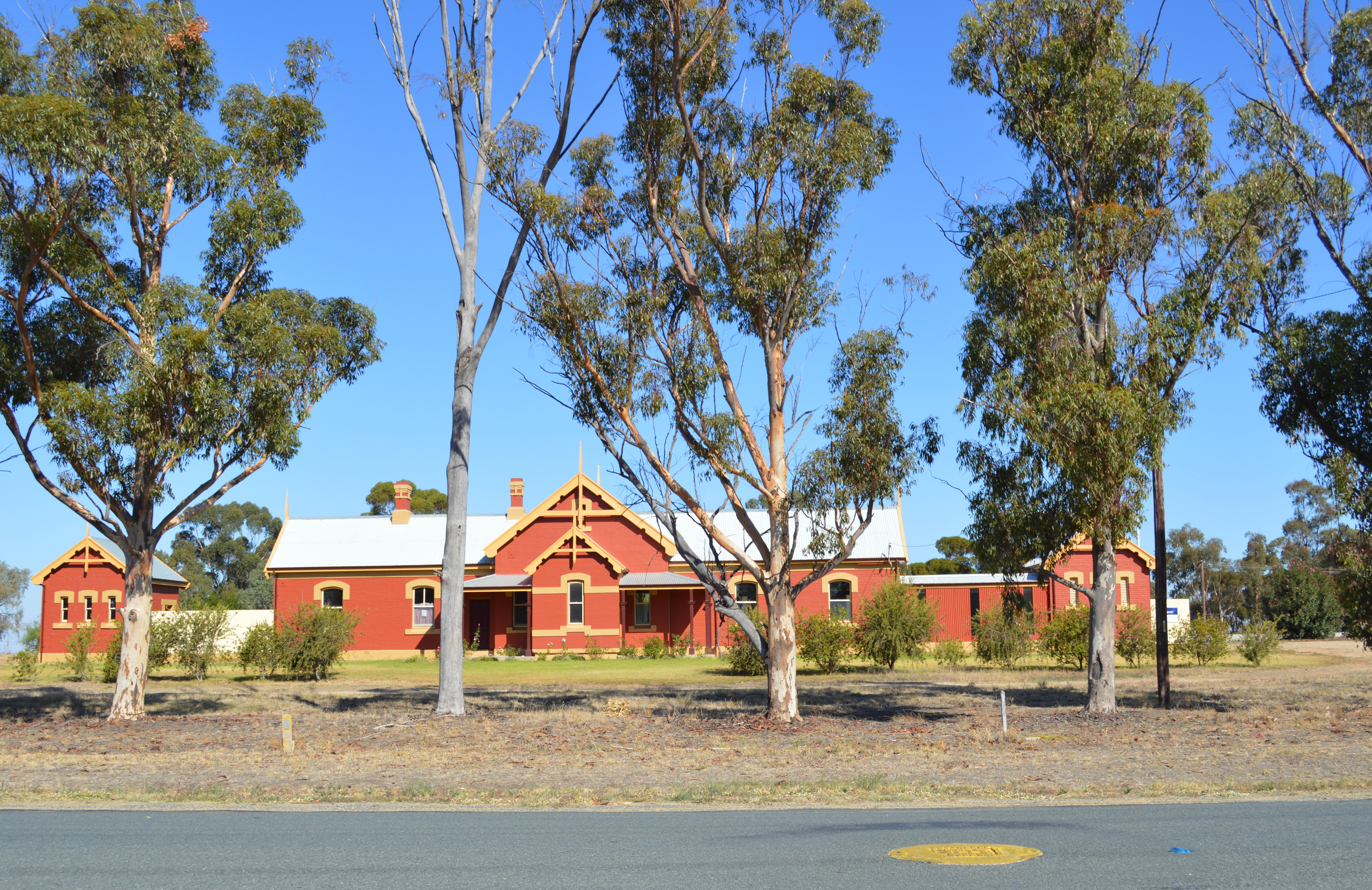
- Jerilderie station building, 2013

- Location within New South Wales Location within Australia
- 35°21′37″S 145°43′35″E
- Location: Nowranie Street, Jerilderie, New South Wales, Australia

History
- Built: 1884–1885
- Built for: New South Wales Government Railways

Site notes
- Architect: John Whitton
- Owner: Murrumbidgee Council; Transport Asset Manager of New South Wales

New South Wales Heritage Register
- Official name: Jerilderie Railway Station Group
- Type: state heritage (complex / group)
- Designated: 17 April 2003
- Reference no.: 1658
- Type: Railway Platform / Station
- Category: Transport – Rail
- Builders: Charles Hardy

The Jerilderie railway station is a heritage-listed former railway station on the now closed Tocumwal line at Nowranie Street, Jerilderie, New South Wales, Australia. The station buildings were designed by John Whitton, and constructed by Charles Hardy in 1884 and 1885. The station complex is known as Jerilderie Railway Station Group, and was added to the New South Wales State Heritage Register on 17 April 2003.

== History ==
The Jerilderie railway station precinct and buildings were designed by John Whitton, who was the Engineer in Chief of the New South Wales Government Railways from 1856 to 1888. Whitton designed a good deal of the extant NSW railways infrastructure, including station buildings. His design ethos created a recognisable and distinctive genre of railway station and station master's house designs throughout NSW.

The Jerilderie station and station master's residence are significant in the small, relatively isolated rural town of Jerilderie. They exemplify the anticipated importance of the railways in the development of Jerilderie area, and in wresting trade away from Victoria. The lessening of railway activity, brought about by improved roads and road transport, is manifested by the decay and removal of infrastructure along railway corridors, and in the precincts of Jerilderie station.

Located 688.4 kilometres (427.8 mi) from Sydney Central station, the Jerilderie station complex was opened on 16 September 1884, and was a major transport centre for Jerilderie until its closure on 6 February 1987. The station building is now a private residence.

== Description ==
The centrepiece of the arrangement of railway facilities at Jerilderie is the passenger station and platform. Jerilderie railway platform was 120 metres (400 ft) long, including ramps at each end, constructed on the up side of the branch line. The imposing single-storey station building, 46.79 metres (153 ft 6 in) long, was built in Empire Style, comprising English bond brickwork, and gabled roofs with a 37 degree pitch, sheeted with corrugated iron. The station building incorporated, from the Sydney-end, a lamp room, an equipment shed (with large underground water tank), a parcels office, the station master's office, a general waiting room, a ticket office, a ladies waiting room and WC, and a gent's urinal and WC.

A number of other structures were built at Jerilderie in the mid-1884 period. The major ones were the goods warehouse (commonly referred to as the goods shed), cattle races, station master's residence, engine shed, coal stage, 15.70-metre (51 ft 6 in) turntable pit and elevated water tank.

Over the next 60 years, additional structures and yard modification were completed.

A signal diagram, issued by the Office of the Signal & Telegraph Engineer on 18 March 1941, illustrated the layout of the railway facilities at Jerilderie. This diagram probably represented the maximum extent of the development of railway facilities at Jerilderie.

Description of railway facilities 1941

Jerilderie was located on the single line branch between the junction station of Narrandera and the ultimate branch terminus station at Tocumwal.

Station Master's Residence

c. 1884, it is a standard design three-chimney, Brickwork#English bond English bond brick residence with a concave roofed verandah, sheltering central door and two single double-hung sash windows. The four front rooms have a pyramid-hipped 17.5 degree pitched roof, and kitchen has an extension of main hipped roof, with a bathroom and laundry with skillion roofs extending to the east form underside of eaves of main roof. An additional skillion part fibro-sheeted walled porch and room further extend under lower skillion roofs. The external door and windows have rendered architraves. A coal bunker with rail-line posts and concrete-plank sides is located between mainline and house, and there is evidence of heating fuel stores in the station building and residence.

=== Condition ===
The original forms and fabric of the Jerilderie station building and station master's residence are readily discernible and retain many aspects that make it significant. In 2001–2002, State Rail Estate carried out the underpinning of footings, repainting, landscaping, and other maintenance. The station building is in good condition, but its foundations have suffered from long-term stresses due to soil movement, exacerbated by poor site drainage and tree roots, which has led to extreme distress and cracking.

Internal walls have been sheeted over with strapped fibro and, more recently, with plaster board that has torn. Original doors, architraves, skirtings and chimney-pieces have been removed. The concrete verandah floor has subsided and cracked. The platform includes levers for signals at the east end. Internally, windows and trim survive, as does a cast iron stove in kitchen.

=== Modifications and dates ===
Station Building

- Platform fences and gates removed - Unknown date
- Lavatory cesspits removed/filled - Unknown date
- East and west sheds removed - Unknown date
- Original front porch and xerandahs removed - Unknown date
- Station building converted to residence and CI clad infill built at location of west end shed - 1993
- Reconstruction of front porch and verandah - 2001
- Repairs maintenance repainting - 2001/2002
- Landscaping to front of station building - 2002

Station Master's Residence

- Addition at rear of fibro walled skillion roof room and porch - unknown
- considerable intrusion - c. 1950's
- Addition of strapped fibro sheet internal linings removal of original doors - pre 1984
- installation of flush panel sliding doors - considerable loss. - c. 1960's
- Removal of chimney-pieces - considerable loss. - Unknown date
- Addition of internal plaster board wall linings to hallway - considerable intrusion - c. 1990's
- Replacement of original ogee-profile eaves gutters - considerable loss - Unknown
- Poor repairs to external wall cracking and saw cut control joints -considerable intrusion - 1990's
- Installation of kitchen cupboards - considerable intrusion. - 1990's

== Heritage listing ==
As at 31 December 2002, the Jerilderie Railway Station Group and station master's residence were complimentary elements of a standard roadside station arrangement as designed by John Whitton and constructed by Charles Hardy of Wagga Wagga c. 1884.

The station building and station master's residence have retained much of their integrity in building forms and many architectural details. The Station Master's Residence retains roof form, three chimney flue tops concave form verandah roof, chamfered posts and bressummer, cast iron corner brackets, and rendered architraves with segmental arch heads to doors and windows. The low roof pitch, at 17.5 degrees, is unusual for railway residences. The station and station master's residence are significant in a small relatively isolated rural town and it illustrates the importance the railways anticipated having in their development of Jerilderie area and in wresting trade away from Victoria. The lessening of railway activity brought about by improved roads and road transport is manifested by the decay and removal of infrastructure along the railway corridors and in the precinct of Jerilderie Station arrangement. The station master's residence and station building group are important architectural and aesthetic items for the township of Jerilderie, particularly as they are masonry structures, derivative from British railways, as compared with timber and weatherboard pioneer stations at places such as Finley, Urana, and Oaklands. The line, and therefore de jure the station buildings, were used during World War II for defence purposes and were part of the transport network integral to the development of Tocumwal Airbase and the defence of Australia.

The Jerilderie railway station was listed on the New South Wales State Heritage Register on 17 April 2003 having satisfied the following criteria.

The place is important in demonstrating the course, or pattern, of cultural or natural history in New South Wales.

The Jerilderie Railway Station Group illustrates a phase in development of the Southern Riverina railway network. It demonstrates as a response by the Government of NSW in the 1880s: To changing land use in the Riverina and the transport of agricultural produce particularly after the Land Selection Acts with smaller farmers involved in cultivation of crops as compared to the grazing industry associated with squatters. An attempt to entice trade away from Victorian ports in a pre-Federation era. The Jerilderie Railway Station Precinct played an important role in the movement of troops during the second World War and the development of the strategic air force base at Tocumwal and in the defence of the Brisbane Line.

The place has a strong or special association with a person, or group of persons, of importance of cultural or natural history of New South Wales's history.

The Jerilderie Railway Station Group and buildings was designed by John Whitton, Engineer in Chief of the NSW railways from 1856 to 1888. Whitton designed much of extant NSW railways infrastructure including station buildings. His particular design ethos has created a genre of railway station and station master's house designs that are recognisable and distinctive throughout NSW. The Jerilderie Railway Station Group are important as part of the body of works Charles Hardy a pre-eminent builder of Wagga Wagga, trained in London, arrive in Melbourne in 1854, aged 21, and moved to Wagga in 1862, with Thomas Hodson with whom he formed a partnership until 1872 when Hodson went to live in Sydney. Hardy continued as Charles Hardy & Co. a firm that by the 1970s employed 250 people. Charles Hardy died in 1908.

The place is important in demonstrating aesthetic characteristics and/or a high degree of creative or technical achievement in New South Wales.

John Whitton developed standardised designs for some of NSW's railway stations. Jerilderie Railway Station is a typical exemplar of this practice for standard roadside station buildings. Whitton's development of a standardised approach to Public building design was relatively innovative for colonial NSW in the 1880s. The genre of station house design of which Jerilderie Railway Station Master's House is representative is aesthetically distinctive in its use of architectural stylistic elements and planning principles. The cast iron lattice work on buildings are of particular aesthetic significance to the railway precinct. Charles Hardy "... insisted on a high standard of work. He brought most of his tradesmen from England and personally supervised most of the building himself, travelling long distances in a sulky. Operation extended to Albury, Corowa, Deniliquin and Euston." In keeping with the changing trend in architectural ornamentation, which took place during the Federation period, Hardy favoured the use of fine joinery both internally and externally.

The place is important in demonstrating the principal characteristics of a class of cultural or natural places/environments in New South Wales.

The Jerilderie Station buildings demonstrate the principal characteristics of a standard roadside railway station arrangement post 1875 and as designed by John Whitton. The Jerilderie Station buildings and original infrastructure has many of the principal characteristics of a British derived design for railway station buildings from the 19th century and colonial NSW. The Jerilderie Station buildings reflect through their planning, detailing and internal architectural elements the hieratic nature for the NSW railways in the 19th century. The Jerilderie Station buildings have retained much of their original form and have a high integrity.

=== Charles Hardy & Co ===
The buildings comprising the Jerilderie railway precinct are important as part of the body of work of Charles Hardy, a pre-eminent builder of Wagga Wagga, trained in London, who arrived in Melbourne in 1854, aged 21, and Wagga Wagga in 1862. He formed a partnership there with Thomas Hodson, which lasted until 1877, when Hodson moved to Sydney. Hardy continued the business as Charles Hardy & Co. a firm that, by the 1970s, employed 250 people.

Hardy had learnt his trade as an apprentice in London. The early commissions of the Thomas-Hodson partnership included the Methodist Church (opened April 1865, now demolished), the Australian Joint Stock Bank building (built pre 1870, now demolished) and David Copland's Hall of Commerce in 1872.

After 1875, Hardy was responsible for most of the major buildings in Wagga Wagga, including houses, churches, school buildings, railway stations, flour mills and the council chambers. Hardy had control over most aspects of the building process, including the supply of all materials. The firm had its own brickyards, lime kilns and timber yard. Limestone was obtained from Mundarlo and shipped down the Murrumbidgee River by paddle steamer.

By the 1880s, the business included a steam joinery at Newtown, steam sawmills at Devlin's Siding (Ganmain), brick and tile works in Docker Street, and stone quarries at Buckenbong near Narrandera. Later Hardy bought the brickyards established by George Liscombe in Albury Road, at the south end of town (later Bourke Street) and by the 1920s they had also established a sawmill at Tumbarumba. The company was floated in 1922, as "Riverina Distributors". Hardy died in 1908 and was succeeded by Charles Hardy Junior and W. H. Hardy. In 1924, a hardware store was established in Baylis Street, Wagga Wagga, later moving to Chaston Street.

According to a contemporary account:

[Charles Hardy] "...insisted on a high standard of work. He brought most of his tradesmen from England and personally supervised most of the building himself, travelling long distances in a sulky. Operation extended to Albury, Corowa, Deniliquin and Euston."

In keeping with the changing trend in architectural ornamentation, which took place during the Federation period, Hardy favoured the use of fine joinery both internally and externally.

Buildings known to have been constructed by Charles Hardy & Co. include: Dorset Cottage in Trail Street, the Hardy family home (now much altered); the Wagga Wagga Public School, Gurwood Street 1872; the Bank of NSW, 1874; Bomen railway station, built by Charles Hardy, Matthew Callaghan, and Stapleton Minchin from October 1877; Borambola, commissioned by John Donnelly in 1878; Wagga Wagga railway station, built by Charles Hardy, Ebenezer Shaw, and Stapleton Minchin from October 1879; 1884 Union (later ANZ) Bank (designed by William Wilkinson Wardell and later modified); Wagga Wagga Council Chambers, late 1880s; 81-83 Johnston Street, built c. 1890 by Charles Hardy, possibly for the Hardy family (the Hardys built other similar building in the Gurwood/Trail/Johnston Streets area, none of which are extant); Toonga, Tarcutta, built 1895 for Alfred Mate, a son of T. H. Mate of Tarcutta; 55 Trail Street, Athalie, built for one time Wagga Mayor John McGrath, c. early 1890s; Uranquinty School, built in 1899; Wagga Wagga Court House, designed by Walter Liberty Vernon and built in 1900; 40 Trail Street, built for Mr Jim Hawkins early 1900s; 100 Peter Street; 77 Johnston Street, designed by William Monks as his own residence (presumably built by Hardy); 16 The Esplanade, and all buildings and structures at Hay railway station precinct. Gerogery station building contract drawing has Charles Hardy's signature there on. He is also thought to have constructed all railway structures from Junee to Narrandera.
