= Urangeline, New South Wales =

Urangeline New South Wales
- Coordinates: 35°25′58″S 146°37′8″E
- Population: 31 (SAL 2021)
- Postcode(s): 2656
- Elevation: 151 m (495 ft)
- Location: 9 km (6 mi) from Urangeline East; 16 km (10 mi) from Bidgeemia
- County: Urana
- State electorate(s): Wagga Wagga

Urangeline is a village community in the central part of the Riverina. It is situated by road, about 9 kilometres north from Urangeline East and 16 kilometres north east from Bidgeemia.

Urangeline Post Office opened on 1 January 1882 and closed in 1934.

== Sports and Recreation ==
Evidence of the Urangeline Football Club was first published in 1912 when they defeated Osborne Football Club in a game of Australian Rules Football. The club played a few friendly games per year against other local towns between 1912 and 1915, before going into recess during World War One.

The Urangeline Football Association was formed in 1919 from the following clubs - Pleasant Hills, Osborne and Urangeline, with Osborne winning the first premiership in 1919.

Urangeline FC played in the Lockhart & District Football Association in 1920, which was won by Pleasant Hills FC.

In 1921 The Urangeline "All Blacks" joined the Pleasant Hills Football Association and were undefeated premiers. Then in 1922, Osborne defeated them in the grand final by one point.

In 1923 the Urangeline FA was reformed with Osborne defeating Urangeline by four points in the grand final at the Bidgeemia oval.

In 1924 the Urangeline & DFA competition consisted of the following teams - Pleasant Hills, Osborne, The Diggers and Urangeline. Osborne went onto to win the 1924 premiership too.

In 1925, The Urangeline & DFA, had six teams in the competition and both Lockhart FC and Milbrulong FC were expelled from the competition on the eve of the finals series, for refusing to play their final at Urangeline. Urangeline FC were defeated by Osborne FC in the grand final played at Pleasant Hills and won Mrs Maloney's Cup.

In 1926, Urangeline hosted the grand final between Lockhart and Osborne, with Osborne winning the Church Cup, 34 to 24 points.

In 1927. the Urangeline & DFA, changed their name to the Osborne & District Football League and Urangeline FC went into recess, but the Urangeline Diggers FC entered the competition, which was won by Osborne FC by defeating Rand by 13 points at Bidgeemia. Urangeline continued to play in the Osborne & DFL in 1928.

In 1930, Urangeline FC were in training for a football match against Bidgeemia, with the hope of reforming the Urangeline & DFA competition with Lockhart FC, Osborne FC and Rand FC.

In 1939 the club was reformed, after being in recess for ten years and they decided on wearing a pale blue and gold guernsey, with white football shorts.

In 1940, the Urangeline FC went into recess due to World War Two and donated their surplus funds of £2 to the local Red Cross branch.

The first report of cricket in the Urangeline area was a game between the Urangeline Cricket Club (CC) and Lockhart CC, which was won by Urangeline CC in 1913.
