= Attunga, New South Wales =

Attunga
- Town
- Coordinates: 30°55′46″S 150°50′42″E
- Country: Australia
- State: New South Wales
- LGA: Tamworth Regional Council
- Location: 20 km (12 mi) nw of Tamworth; 30 km (19 mi) from Manilla

Government
  - State electorate: Tamworth
  - Federal division: New England
- Elevation: 374 m (1,227 ft)

Population
  - Total: 542 (2021 census)
- Postcode: 2345

Attunga is a small farming community in the New England region of New South Wales Australia. It lies about 20–21 km north-west of Tamworth.

== History ==
The Gamilaraay people lived in the area for thousands of years. The name is possibly from the Gamilaraay language meaning "a high place".

In 1834 the Australian Agricultural Company attained the 313,000-acre (1,270 km^{2}) Peel Estate at Goonoo Goonoo, part of its million-acre grant from the Government at the time, in order to graze 6,000 sheep.

In the 1840s, John Brown Bossley squatted in the area and named his property "Attunga". Bossley's sister Mary Anne married Sydney ironmonger Thomas Burdekin, who had acquired vast tracts of New South Wales land, often through aggressive foreclosure and usury practices. After Thomas's death in 1844, the Bossley siblings consolidated much of their landholdings as "Bossley and Burdekin". In 1848, the New South Wales government made Bossley's property legal with a pastoral lease, describing “Attunga” as “bounded on the east by high stony ranges”.

Mary Burdekin's son Sydney Burdekin would go on to manage much of the family's property in the north of NSW. He lived at Attunga for some years at the stately home, "Attunga House" and employed many people in the area.

The Department of Lands notified it had set aside a site for the “Village of Attunga” in 1864 and it was officially proclaimed in 1899.

Sydney Burdekin sold Attunga Station in 1875 to Alexander Rogers. Some of Attunga Run was resumed in June 1885. The first recorded burials at the Attunga Cemetery date from 1872 with the earliest inscriptions dated 1881.

An early Attunga Post Office was opened on 1 October 1870 and closed on 31 July 1871. A second post office opened on 1 May 1874. A post office at Attunga Springs operated from 1 May 1881 till 10 June 1911.

BHP opened a limestone quarry there in 1919.

Population growth remained slow until the mid-twentieth century. The current population of 542 includes families of commuters to Tamworth. Services in Attunga currently include a primary school, supermarket, hotel and sports ground, and rural fire service headquarters.

The late English singer-songwriter Max Bygraves owned "Attunga Park", an 84-hectare farm near the town of Murwillumbah.

== Industries ==
The main industries are sheep and cattle farming, and limestone mining from a mine to the east of the town. The town abuts the Attunga State Forest, a popular walking and camping destination.

The town was served by the Barraba branch railway line until the local station was closed in 1985.

== Environmental issues ==
Recent drought conditions have caused bank erosion along Attunga Creek, as a result of stock movements across and along the creek bed. In 2006 the town of Attunga received funding for a major program of bank stabilisation and revegetation to restrict stock movements to defined corridors near the waterway.
