= Barraba railway line =

Closed railway line in New South Wales, Australia

Barraba Line
- Loading containers of asbestos into rail wagons in Barraba yard

Technical
- Track gauge: 1,435 mm (4 ft 8 1/2 in)

The Barraba branch railway line is a closed railway line in New South Wales, Australia. The line, which was opened on 21 September 1908, ran for 99 kilometres (62 mi) north along the Manilla valley to the town of Barraba from the Main North railway line at West Tamworth.

The railway line crossed the Namoi River at Manilla over a large viaduct and crossed the Peel River just before Attunga. Two Howe timber truss bridges, one over Borah Creek in Upper Manilla (575 km from Sydney Central) and the other over Oakey Creek between Manilla and Attunga (539 km), are heritage listed.

In the 1970s, the Barraba line was served by the unique railmotor, CHP38 (also known as the Creamy Kate). At that period, large quantities of asbestos was railed from Barraba in containers for export.

Rail freight was withdrawn in the 1980s and passenger services on the line ceased in 1983. A 6 km (3.7 mi) section of the line between West Tamworth and Westdale remained open for use as grain wagon storage.

A stop block was in place at Dampier Street, Tamworth and the line was damaged by flood along Wallamore Road on 29 November 2008

On 24 November 2017, it was announced that the line from West Tamworth to Westdale silos would be rebuilt for a new freight centre.
