= Bidgeemia =

- Town
- Coordinates: 35°26′24″S 146°25′48″E
- Country: Australia
- State: New South Wales
- LGA: Lockhart Shire
- Location: 569 km (354 mi) from Sydney; 105 km (65 mi) from Albury; 21 km (13 mi) from Urana; 19 km (12 mi) from Urangeline East

Government
  - State electorate: Wagga Wagga
  - Federal division: Riverina

Population
  - Total: 32 (SAL 2021)
- Postcode: 2642
- County: Urana

Bidgeemia is a rural community in the central part of the Riverina. By road it is about nineteen kilometres west of Urangeline East and twenty-one kilometres east of Urana.

Bidgeemia Public School closed in 1972 but there still exist a public Hall and a shared church, which has held its last service. Bidgeemia Post Office opened on 1 November 1922 and closed in 1955.
