= Morundah =

- Town
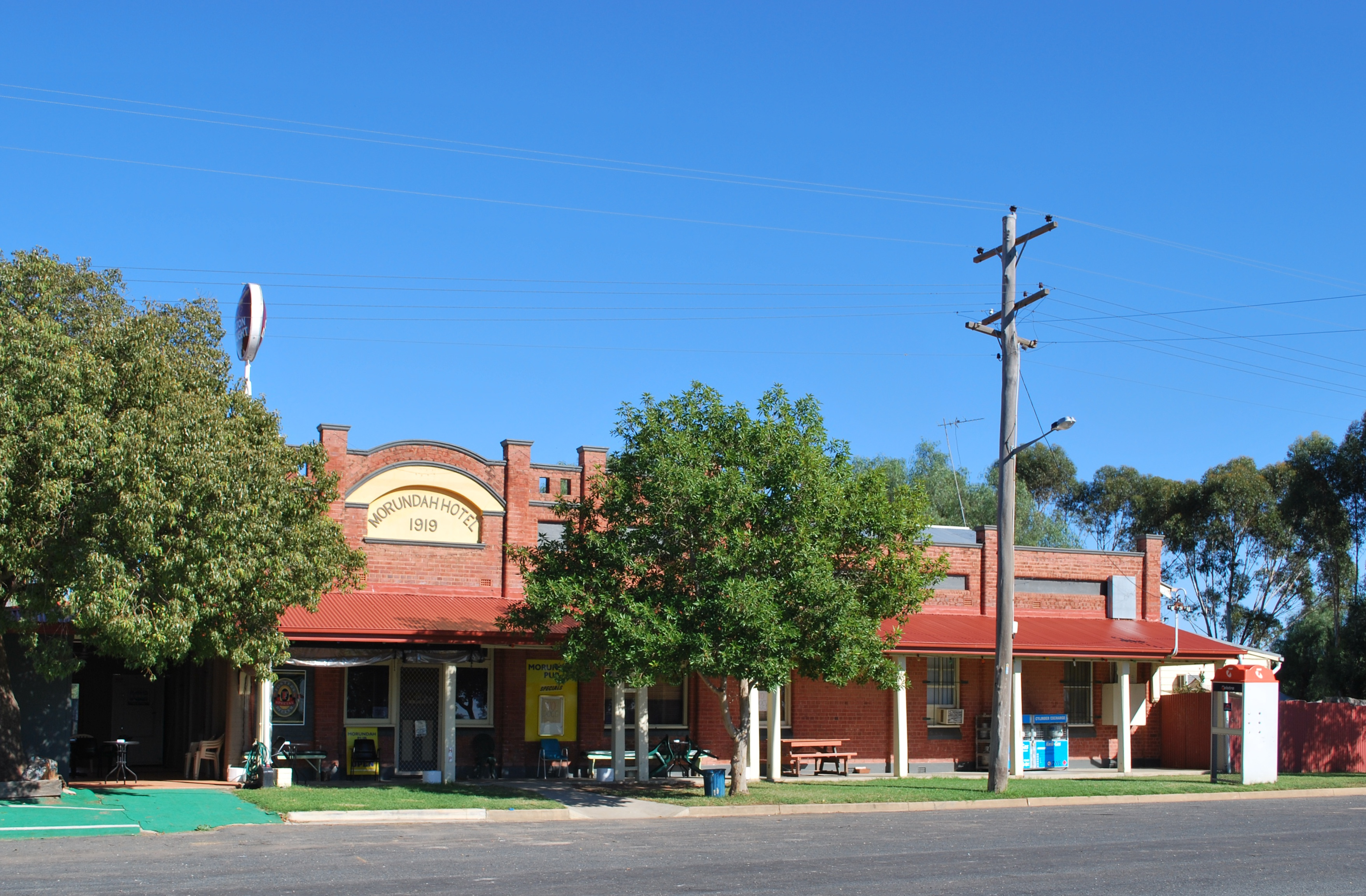
- The hotel in Morundah

- Coordinates: 34°56′0″S 146°18′0″E
- Country: Australia
- State: New South Wales
- LGA: Federation Council
- Location: 582 km (362 mi) SW of Sydney; 390 km (240 mi) N of Melbourne; 32 km (20 mi) SW of Narrandera; 70 km (43 mi) NE of Jerilderie; 50 km (31 mi) NW of Urana

Government
  - State electorate: Albury
  - Federal division: Farrer
- Elevation: 124 m (407 ft)

Population
  - Total: 24 (2021 census)
- Postcode: 2700
- County: Urana

Morundah /məˈrʌndə/ is a small town in the Murray region of New South Wales, Australia. The town is located on the Newell Highway and in the Federation Council local government area. The town consists of a hotel, some silos and a few houses. At the 2021 census, Morundah had a population of 24.

Colombo Creek Post Office opened on 1 May 1877, was renamed Murundah in 1889 and Morundah in 1895. It closed in 1982.

Morundah was served by the now closed Tocumwal railway line. Morundah railway station opened on 16 September 1884 and closed on 17 November 1975.

Morundah Football Club was an Australian Rules Football club that competed in the Faithful & District Football Association from 1924 - 1939. The club went into recess from 1940 to 1945 due to World War Two and did not re-form after WW2.

Morundah is notable for its recent tradition of hosting opera performances, including the touring arm of Opera Australia, OzOpera's performance of Carmen in 2006 and the performance of Cosi fan tutte by the Victorian Opera in 2007. In 2012, Co-Opera's performance of Die Fledermaus was very well received.

In 2016, the old "opera house"—which was basically a prefabricated pig shed—was demolished and replaced by a larger permanent structure, designed to cater for not only opera, but a range of other types of events.

== Gallery ==
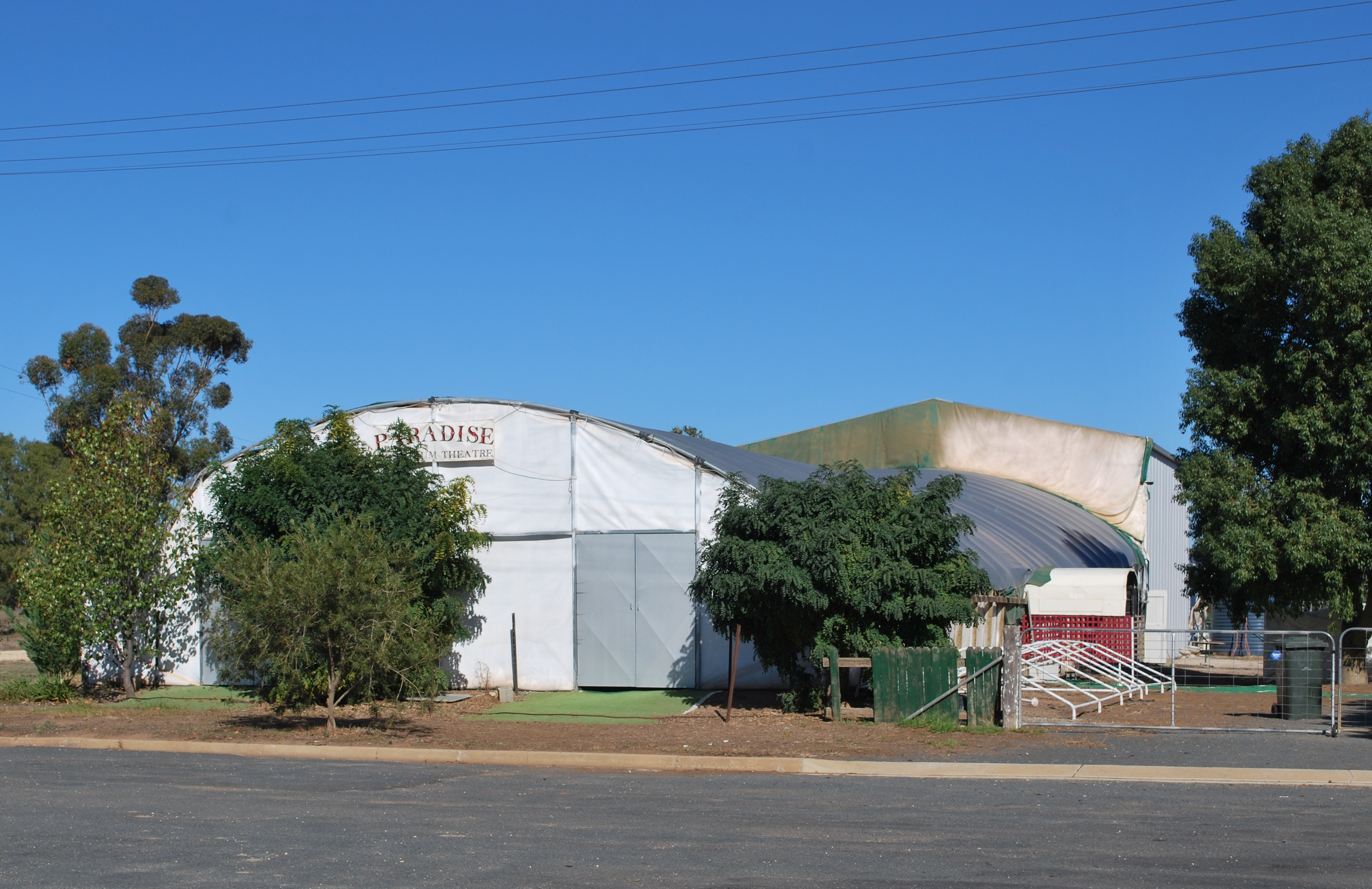
The Morundah "Opera House"

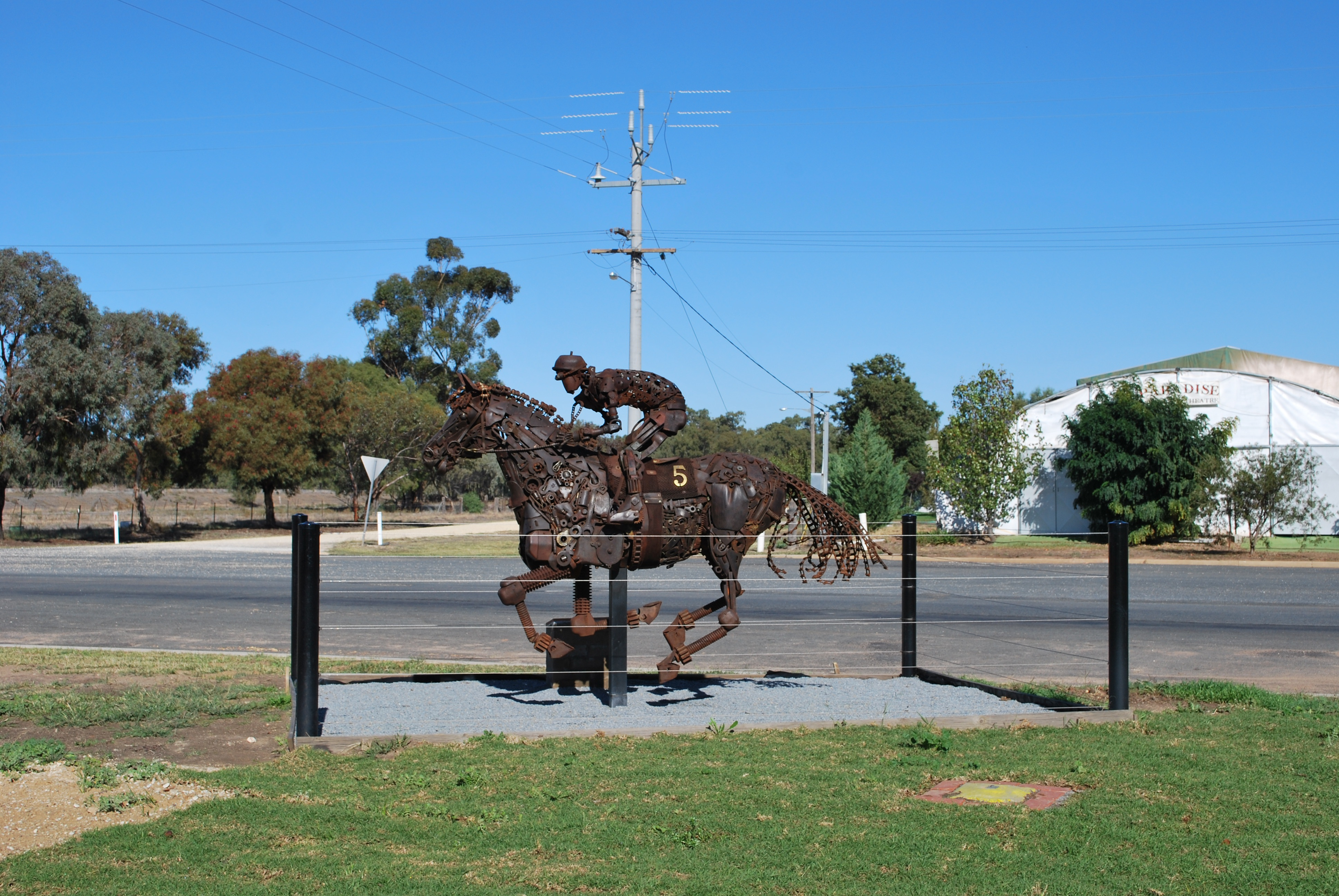
A statue of a racehorse built out of scrap metal by local artist Andrew Whitehead

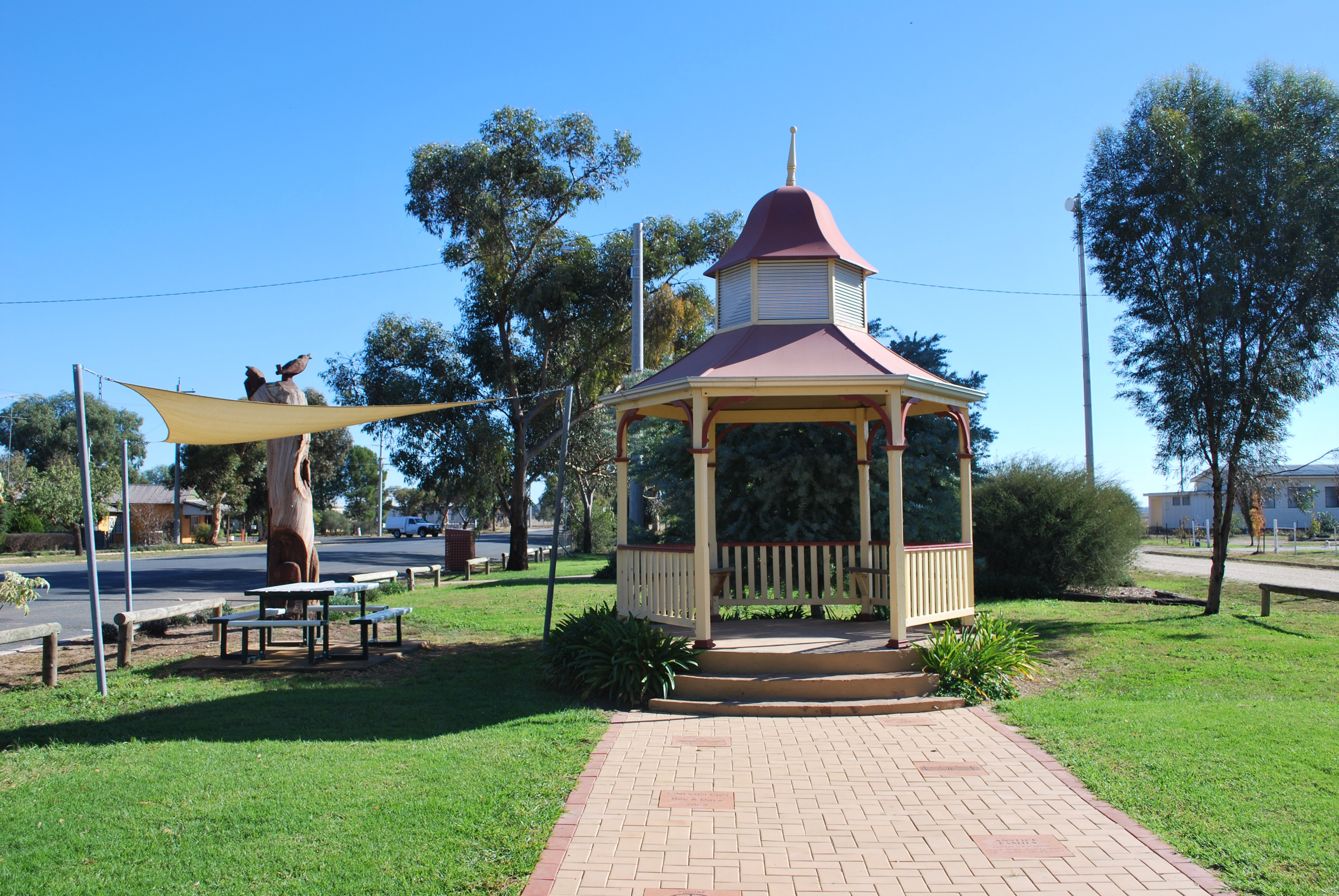
Rotunda
