= Narrandera railway station =

Railway station in New South Wales, Australia

Narrandera
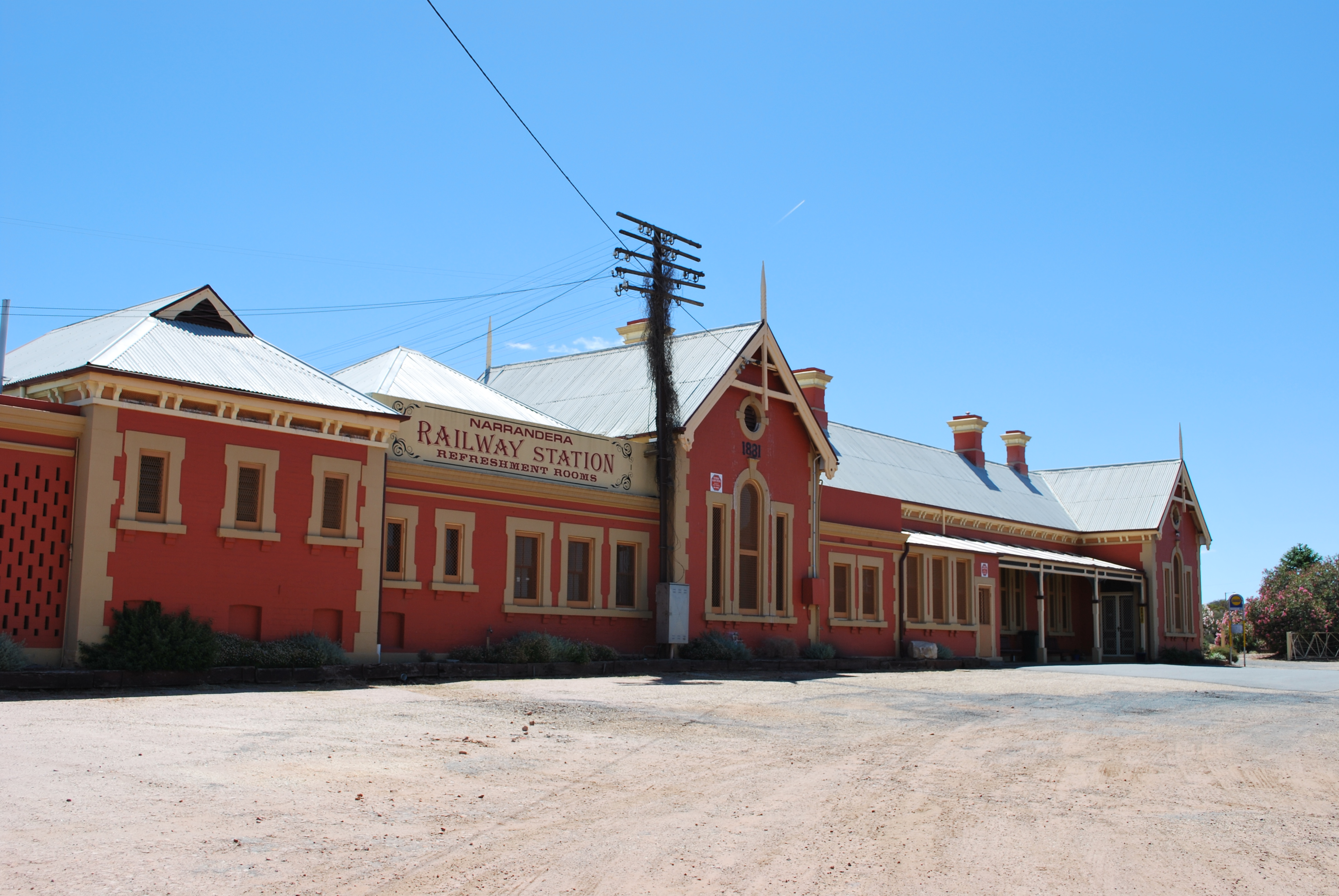
- Station building and entrance, November 2009

General information
- Location: Newell Highway, Narrandera
- Coordinates: 34°44′26″S 146°33′28″E
- Owner: Transport Asset Manager of New South Wales
- Operator: NSW TrainLink
- Lines: Hay; Tocumwal
- Distance: 583.48 kilometres from Central
- Platforms: 1
- Tracks: 2

Construction
- Structure type: Ground
- Parking: Yes
- Accessible: Yes

Other information
- Station code: NRA

History
- Opened: 28 February 1881; 145 years ago

Services
Preceding station	NSW TrainLink	Following station
Leeton towards Griffith	NSW TrainLink Southern Line Griffith Xplorer	Coolamon towards Sydney
Former services
Preceding station	Former services	Following station
Former NSW Branch line services
Yanco towards Hay	Hay Line	Grong Grong towards Junee
Corobimilla towards Tocumwal	Tocumwal Line	Terminus
Location

Narrandera railway station is a heritage-listed railway station located at Whitton Street (Newell Highway), Narrandera, Narrandera Shire, New South Wales, Australia. It is situated on the Hay railway line, and was formerly the junction station for the Tocumwal railway line. It was built in 1880 by Charles Hardy to a design attributed to John Whitton. The property was added to the New South Wales State Heritage Register on 2 April 1999.

== History ==
The station is located on the Hay branch line. The line opened from Junee to Narrandera in 1881. Charles Hardy was issued a contract for construction of the railway station at Narrandera on 1 September 1880 with the second-class station building completed for the opening of the line on 28 February 1881.

In April 1873, John Sutherland, the Minister for Public Works, set out a policy to complete 'the main trunk railways'; both the Main Southern line to Albury and the Western trunk route to Bourke on the Darling River were responses to the threat that wool from the Riverina and the west would be diverted to Melbourne via river boats and the Victorian railway to Echuca on the Murray River, which opened in 1864. The construction of the line to Narrandera, however, was perpetuated by pastoral interests that overthrew the "Trunk Railways Policy". This laid the foundations for the era of "railway mania" between 1877 and 1887 when railway leagues were established in towns and villages across the inland to lobby for branch lines to serve their area. In the five years from December 1879, the NSW railway network increased 136 per cent from 1174 km to 2771 km in length, dubbing the period as the "Great Railway Years". Narrandera was one of many centres in NSW (along with Hay and other towns in surrounding districts) to benefit from the "railway mania" of the 1870s and 1880s.

The opening of the Narrandera-Hay line played a major part in bringing about the decline of the riverboat trade in southern NSW and helped secure the trade of produce from the Riverina for Sydney, whereas it had previously gone predominantly to Melbourne. Narrandera's prosperity increased considerably following the arrival of the railway.

In 1884, a grand two-storey residence was constructed for the Station Master, indicating the importance of Narrandera as a key town in the NSW network and the prominence attributed to the position of the railway Station Master.

On 16 September 1884, Narrandera became a junction station when the Tocumwal line opened to Jerilderie.

Some of the early changes to the station at Narrandera included: the erection of the Junction name board (1891), provision of horse posts at front of station building (1891), office for the Traffic sub-inspector (1891), Hay line brought in to Narrandera independently of Tocumwal branch line, construction of overbridge at Junee end of station (1892), installation of 20 tonne cart weighbridge and an additional coal stage (1900), loop erected for stock loading (1902), provision of an 18.2m turntable (1910), conversion of the ladies waiting room into a refreshment room (1912), and many other additions.

Initially, the main freight moved to Sydney included wool, sheep and small amounts of wheat. During the early decades of the 20th century the quantities of wheat freight increased greatly with a wheat stacking site provided in 1916. The station building was extended in 1912 and again in 1917 with the opening of the Railway Refreshment rooms. A cottage was also built in 1917 for refreshment room staff.

From 1910 to 1950, special trains were used to transport football players and spectators within the Riverina district, with women doing the weekly shopping at the same time. Trains also carried passengers to Narrandera for swimming carnivals and the Easter sporting carnivals and cycling races. Special trains were also used to carry passengers to the district railway picnic days.

During the 1940s and 1950s, activity at the Narrandera station and yard was at its peak. A new barracks building was constructed in 1941 and the platform was extended at the Sydney end in 1942.

By the 1970s and 1980s, rail services in the south and south west of NSW had declined, with the Tocumwal line closing in December 1988. Narrandera station is no longer attended by station staff and is serviced by road coaches connecting with trains at Junee, and a once weekly passenger rail service.

The two-storey Station Master's residence is still extant, but was sold in 1988 and is now in private ownership.

== Services ==
Narrandera is served by the twice weekly NSW TrainLink Xplorer between Griffith and Sydney split from Canberra services at Goulburn. NSW TrainLink also operate a road coach service from Wagga Wagga to Griffith via Narrandera.

Platform	Line	Stopping pattern	Notes
1	Southern Region	Services to Griffith & Goulburn	

== Description ==
The station complex consists of a brick station building of a type 3, second-class design with a stone platform, completed in 1881; a type K signal box situated on the platform, completed in 1925; a railway barracks; engine shed; turntable dating from 1910; 5 ton jib crane; 20 ton weighbridge; 35 ton weighbridge; and a water tank.

Station building (1891)

The Narrandera station building is single storey and constructed of painted brick. There are rendered quoins and rendered surrounds to windows and door openings. Both the recessed entrance porch and the platform verandah have stop chamfered timber posts and iron lace brackets. The main roof is gabled with two transverse gables at either end and clad with corrugated iron; the roof extension at one end of the station is a mixture of a hipped form and gable hipped form. Both roofs have eaves supported by paired brackets. There is simple timberwork to the gables, together with finials, and there are round vents with render trim on the gables as well. The station has four chimneys with bracketed cornices.

The original 1881 platform face is constructed of stone with later brick extensions.

Signal box (1925)

Small precast concrete drop slab building with timber framed windows. The roof is gabled and clad in corrugated sheet metal.

The station building retains a high level of intactness.

== Heritage listing ==
The Narrandera Railway Precinct is of state significance as a tangible link to the NSW Government Railway's ambitious programme to open up the agricultural regions of the state to commerce and communication in the late 19th century. Constructed during the railway boom of the 1880s, Narrandera Railway Precinct is significant for its role in the end of the riverboat trade which secured the Riverina wool trade by providing a direct link to the Sydney markets and ports. The precinct remains as a partly intact late Victorian railway complex with items dating from the opening of the station in 1881, namely the station building which is a dominant civic landmark that demonstrates the historic importance of Narrandera as a strategic and significant station in the NSW network.

Narrandera railway station was listed on the New South Wales State Heritage Register on 2 April 1999 having satisfied the following criteria.

The place is important in demonstrating the course, or pattern, of cultural or natural history in New South Wales.

The site is significant as a partly intact late Victorian railway complex with items dating from the opening of the station in 1881. Railway operations at Narrandera date back to the "Great Railway Years" in NSW in the late 19th century, with the station opening during the time of the earliest development of railway infrastructure in south western NSW in the 1880s. Narrandera Railway Precinct has historic significance for its connection to the NSW Government Railway's ambitious programme to open up the agricultural regions of the state to commerce and communication in the late 19th century. The penetration of the railway into the Riverina area also reveals inter-colonial rivalry in the late 19th century, namely concerns by the NSW government about Victorian competition for agricultural produce in this region. The site is significant for the role it played in the decline of the riverboat trade which helped secure the Riverina wool trade for Sydney, instead of Melbourne. Narrandera prospered greatly after the arrival of the railway, with the railway enhancing transport, communications and commerce in the Narrandera area. Narrandera is also significant as the junction for the branch line to Jerilderie and Tocumwal.

The place has a strong or special association with a person, or group of persons, of importance of cultural or natural history of New South Wales's history.

As with many railway locations constructed in NSW, Narrandera Railway Precinct has associations with the Engineer-in-Chief of the NSWGR, John Whitton, who personally signed all of the construction drawings associated with the 1881 station building at Narrandera. The station is also located on Whitton Street, named after John Whitton, demonstrating his prominence in NSW during the 1880s.

The place is important in demonstrating aesthetic characteristics and/or a high degree of creative or technical achievement in New South Wales.

Narrandera station building has aesthetic significance as a fine example of a late Victorian second-class station building. The station building is a substantial and aesthetically significant structure with a large awning to the platform and includes some notable decorative features such as bargeboards, finials and pendants.

The place has strong or special association with a particular community or cultural group in New South Wales for social, cultural or spiritual reasons.

The site is of social significance to the local community on account of its lengthy association for providing an important source of employment, trade and social interaction for the local area. The site is significant for its ability to contribute to the local community's sense of place, is a distinctive feature of the daily life of many community members, and provides a connection to the local community's past.

The place possesses uncommon, rare or endangered aspects of the cultural or natural history of New South Wales.

The stone platform face is rare, and are found at only 12 other station sites in NSW.

The place is important in demonstrating the principal characteristics of a class of cultural or natural places/environments in New South Wales.

Narrandera railway precinct is a notable example of a late Victorian second-class station building, similar in design and scale to other railway stations at comparable locations in southern and western NSW. The place also has representative significance for its collection of railway structures including the signal box, barracks, engine shed, crane, turntable, weighbridge and other related items that collectively demonstrate widespread 19th and early 20th century railway customs, activities and design in NSW, and are representative of similar items that are found in other railway sites across the state.
