= Urana County =

Urana New South Wales
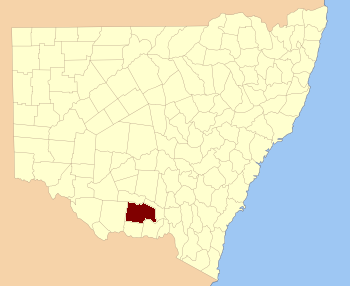
- Location in New South Wales
Lands administrative divisions around Urana:
Boyd	Boyd	Mitchell
Townsend	Urana	Mitchell
Townsend	Denison	Hume

Urana County is one of the 141 cadastral divisions of New South Wales. It contains the towns of Urana and Bidgeemia.

The name Urana is believed to be derived from a local Aboriginal word, and is referenced in relation to the town of Urana, New South Wales as coming from the Aboriginal word 'airana', meaning a temporary shelter (usually consisting of a simple frame of branches covered with bark, leaves, or grass).

== Parishes within this county ==
A full list of parishes found within this county; their current LGA and mapping coordinates to the approximate centre of each location is as follows:

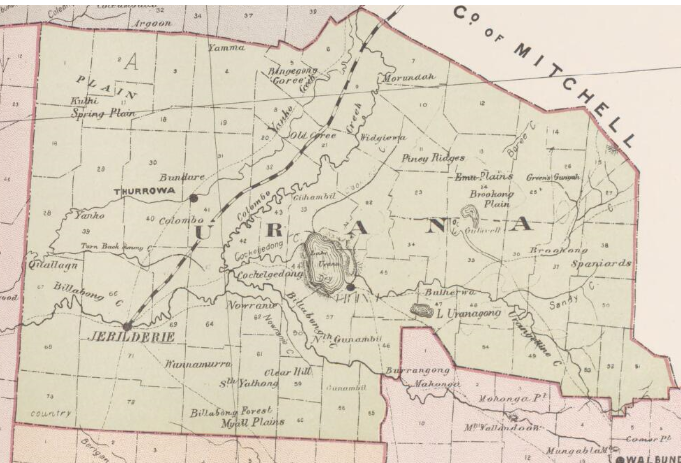
Urana County NSW as shown on John Sands 1886 map)

Parish	LGA	Coordinates
Betts	Federation Council	35°04′54″S 146°13′04″E
Bingagong	Federation Council	34°58′54″S 146°17′04″E
Bolton	Murrumbidgee Council	35°12′54″S 145°49′04″E
Booroobanilly	Murrumbidgee Council	35°28′54″S 145°34′04″E
Boree Creek	Federation Council	35°04′54″S 146°39′04″E
Boreegerry	Federation Council	35°32′54″S 146°05′04″E
Brookong North	Lockhart Shire	35°10′54″S 146°00′04″E
Brookong	Lockhart Shire	35°17′54″S 146°35′04″E
Broome	Murrumbidgee Council	35°05′54″S 145°49′04″E
Bundure North	Murrumbidgee Council	35°02′54″S 145°59′04″E
Bundure	Murrumbidgee Council	35°05′54″S 145°59′04″E
Butherwa	Federation Council	35°15′54″S 146°21′04″E
Cadell	Murrumbidgee Council	35°01′54″S 145°52′04″E
Carnerney	Murrumbidgee Council	35°16′15″S 145°50′08″E
Clear Hill	Federation Council	35°28′54″S 146°11′04″E
Clear Hill	Federation Council	35°30′54″S 146°10′04″E
Clive	Lockhart Shire	35°23′54″S 146°45′04″E
Clyde	Narrandera Shire	35°01′54″S 146°27′04″E
Cocketgedong	Federation Council	35°14′54″S 145°59′04″E
Colkmannan	Federation Council	34°57′54″S 146°08′04″E
Colombo	Federation Council	35°07′54″S 146°06′04″E
Combermere	Federation Council	35°23′54″S 146°05′04″E
Coonong	Federation Council	35°11′54″S 146°10′04″E
Coree North	Murrumbidgee Council	35°17′54″S 145°35′04″E
Coree South	Murrumbidgee Council	35°23′54″S 145°34′04″E
Crommelin	Federation Council	35°00′54″S 146°07′04″E
Cullivel	Lockhart Shire	35°16′54″S 146°30′04″E
Douglas	Federation Council	35°04′54″S 146°04′04″E
Faed	Federation Council	35°22′54″S 146°22′04″E
Finlay	Lockhart Shire	35°25′54″S 146°35′04″E
Galore	Lockhart Shire	35°10′54″S 146°45′04″E
Goolgumbla	Murrumbidgee Council	35°03′54″S 145°37′04″E
Gunambill	Federation Council	35°15′54″S 146°15′04″E
Gunambill	Federation Council	35°33′54″S 146°15′04″E
Hardie	Murrumbidgee Council	35°28′54″S 145°54′04″E
Hastings	Federation Council	35°23′54″S 146°10′04″E
Hebden	Lockhart Shire	35°17′54″S 146°40′04″E
Henty	Federation Council	35°28′54″S 146°05′04″E
Howell	Federation Council	34°55′54″S 146°14′04″E
Jerilderie North	Murrumbidgee Council	35°17′54″S 145°44′04″E
Jerilderie South	Murrumbidgee Council	35°22′54″S 145°44′04″E
Kendall	Federation Council	35°13′54″S 146°04′04″E
Lake	Federation Council	35°06′54″S 146°31′04″E
Lockhart	Lockhart Shire	35°12′54″S 146°46′04″E
Mairjimmy	Murrumbidgee Council	35°30′54″S 145°46′04″E
Morundah South	Federation Council	35°06′54″S 146°21′04″E
Morundah	Federation Council	35°01′18″S 146°22′31″E
Mucra	Lockhart Shire	35°11′54″S 146°30′04″E
Munyabla	Lockhart Shire	35°27′54″S 146°48′04″E
Napier	Lockhart Shire	35°17′54″S 146°46′04″E
North Gunambill	Federation Council	35°25′54″S 146°16′04″E
Nowranie	Murrumbidgee Council	35°21′54″S 146°01′04″E
Osborne	Lockhart Shire	35°11′54″S 146°41′04″E
Palmer	Murrumbidgee Council	35°26′54″S 146°01′04″E
Palmer	Federation Council	35°30′54″S 146°01′04″E
Piney Ridge	Federation Council	35°10′54″S 146°22′04″E
Pullega	Murrumbidgee Council	34°55′54″S 145°53′04″E
Ross	Lockhart Shire	35°27′54″S 146°40′04″E
Stanley	Murrumbidgee Council	35°05′54″S 145°42′04″E
Sumner	Lockhart Shire	35°25′54″S 146°31′04″E
Thurrowa	Jerilderie	35°09′54″S 145°58′04″E
Urana	Federation Council	35°19′54″S 146°16′04″E
Urangeline	Lockhart Shire	35°21′54″S 146°31′04″E
Wallandoon	Lockhart Shire	35°27′54″S 146°44′04″E
Waloona	Murrumbidgee Council	34°54′54″S 145°40′04″E
Watt	Federation Council	35°15′54″S 146°09′04″E
Waugh	Federation Council	34°58′54″S 146°23′04″E
Widgiewa	Federation Council	35°11′54″S 146°16′04″E
Wilson	Federation Council	35°29′54″S 146°17′04″E
Wood	Murrumbidgee Council	35°09′54″S 145°35′04″E
Wunnamurra	Murrumbidgee Council	35°26′54″S 145°43′04″E
Yamma	Murrumbidgee Council	34°56′54″S 146°00′04″E
Yanko South	Murrumbidgee Council	34°59′54″S 145°48′04″E
Yanko	Murrumbidgee Council	34°54′54″S 145°47′04″E
Yathong South	Murrumbidgee Council	35°22′54″S 145°54′04″E
Yathong	Murrumbidgee Council	35°17′17″S 145°55′06″E
