= Jerilderie =

Jerilderie Dyiriildhuray
- Town
- Coordinates: 35°21′0″S 145°44′0″E
- Country: Australia
- State: New South Wales
- Region: Riverina
- LGA: Murrumbidgee Council
- Location: 618 km (384 mi) WSW of Sydney; 315 km (196 mi) N of Melbourne; 167 km (104 mi) W of Wagga Wagga; 137 km (85 mi) N of Shepparton
- Established: 1859
- Council seat: Coleambally

Government
  - Councillor: Ruth McRae OAM
  - State electorate: Murray
  - Federal division: Farrer

Area
  - Total: 3,375.4 km^{2} (1,303.2 sq mi)

Population
  - Total: 922 (2021 census)
  - Density: 0.27/km^{2} (0.70/sq mi)
- Time zone: UTC+10 (AEST)
  - Summer (DST): UTC+11 (AEDT)
- Postcode: 2716
- County: Urana
- Mean max temp: 23.7 °C (74.7 °F)
- Mean min temp: 9.5 °C (49.1 °F)
- Annual rainfall: 401.0 mm (15.79 in)
- Website: Jerilderie

Jerilderie (/dʒəˈrɪldəri/; wiradjuri: Dyiriildhuray) is a small, rural town in the central Riverina region of south-western New South Wales, Australia. It is part of the Murrumbidgee Council Local Government Area. At the 2021 census, Jerilderie had a population of 922 people.

It can be found along the Newell Highway 674 kilometres (419 mi) west-southwest of Sydney and 45 kilometres (28 mi) north of the Victorian state border.

The town was raided by Ned Kelly and his gang between 6 February and 10 February 1879, in which the then Bank of Jerilderie was robbed, residents taken hostage, and police locked in the local prison.

== Overview ==
Jerilderie is an irrigated farming centre. The area around Jerilderie produces a quarter of all tomatoes grown in Australia, as well as being a prime Merino stud region. Additionally, Jerilderie has a diverse number of crops such as rice, olives, wheat, canola, mung and soybeans, onions, liquorice, grapes and a number of cattle farms.

The town has two primary schools, Jerilderie Public School and Jerilderie Catholic School, an 18-hole golf course, three pubs, and a hospital which was the first in regional Australia to operate with solar power. This hospital has now been rebuilt as a multi purpose medical centre that incorporates an emergency room, aged care beds and a palliative care bed.

The town has an Australian rules football team competing in the Picola & District Football League.

== Steel Wings Windmill ==
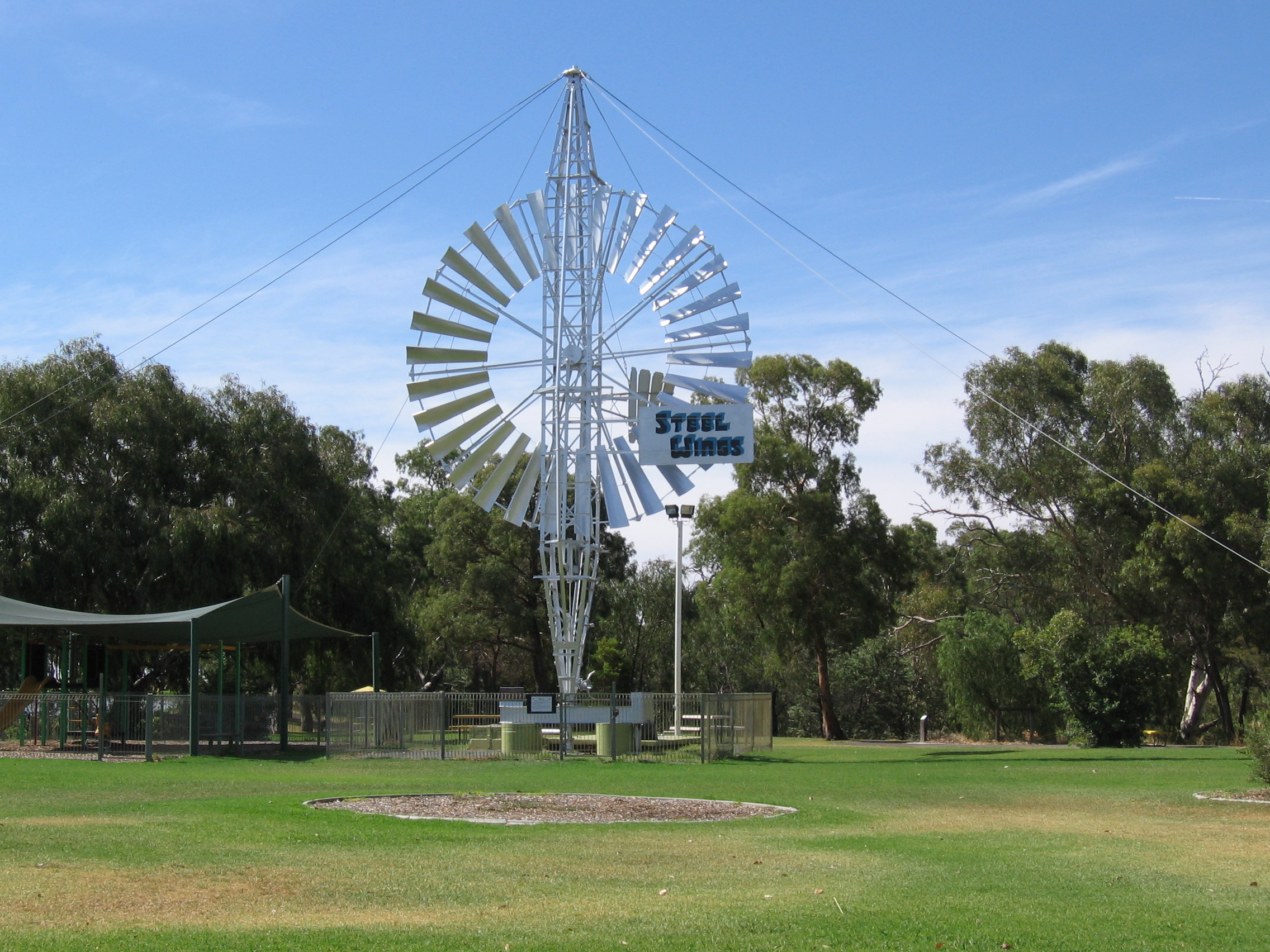
The 'Steel Wings' nose plate acts as a governor and automatically turns the machine out of high winds to save damage.

Jerilderie has rare windmills of unusual design. Both are situated on National Route 39, which provides a straight run from Victoria to the Queensland tropical coast.

The windmill was produced by the Steel Wings Company, in North Sydney between 1907 and 1911 with only six models ever erected. The windmills comprise a steel frame and fan which turns to the wind between a bearing at the bottom and a swivel at the top, all supported by guy-wires. One is also located in the Shire of Taroom in the central Queensland highlands.The fully restored windmills, the only two known working examples in the world, are unique because their fan is contained and spins within the fully pivoting frame.

The Jerilderie Steel Wings windmill, built in 1910, was transported by rail from Sydney and then taken by bullock wagon to Goolgumbula Station for Sir Samuel McCaughey. It provided water to the stations homestead, ram sheds and dams along a 43-kilometre (27 mi) channel system. The mill suffered storm damage in 1977, was offered to the town as a historical exhibit and placed in Luke Park which was named after Thomas Raymond Luke (1908–1979) who was one of the main 'stirrers' for the construction of the lake. Shortly after the lake was completed 'Tommy' Luke died while water-skiing on the lake he had been so instrumental in creating. (Since the 1960s locals had been skiing on the creek nearby and for years had wanted a more suitable facility.) A secondary use for the lake was to hold excess water from the Billabong Creek which flooded annually.

In 1989, members of Lions, Apex and the then Jerilderie Shire Council repaired and refurbished the windmill with two people, Clive Langfield and George Cornish (now dec.) spending some 600 hours to bring it to its present working condition, pumping 9 litres (2.4 US gal) per revolution from the Billabong Creek to the Jerilderie Lake using a 15-centimetre (5.9 in) draw plunger with a 48-centimetre (19 in) stroke. The Jerilderie windmill, the larger of the two stands 17 metres (56 ft) high with a 9-metre (30 ft) fan.

== Notable people ==
=== Ned Kelly ===
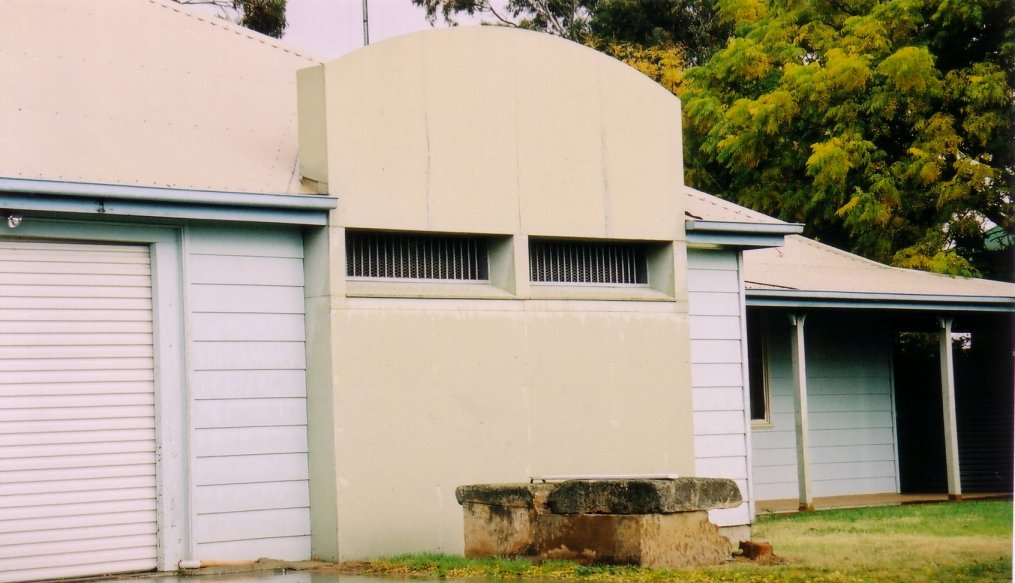
Jerilderie Police Station gaol in the design of Ned Kelly's armour.

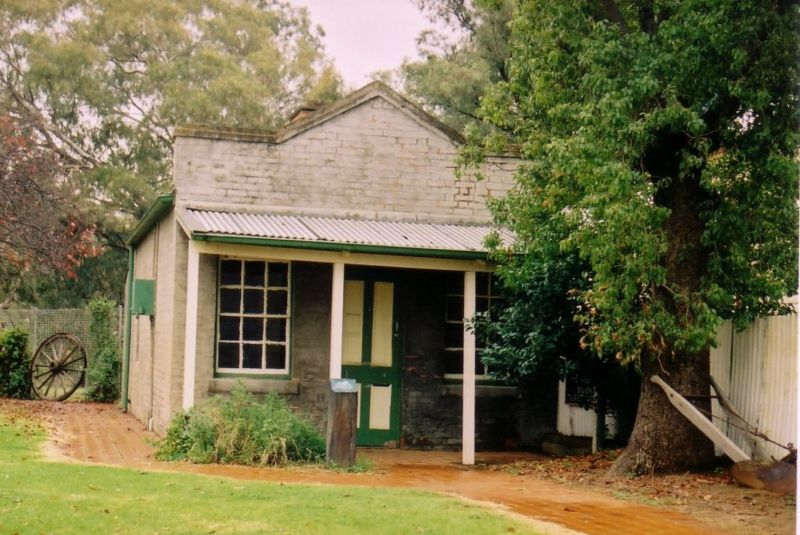
The Jerilderie Telegraph Office, once broken into by Ned Kelly.

Jerilderie was visited by Ned Kelly and his gang in 1879. The outlaws captured the town's two policemen and imprisoned them in their own cell before dressing in the police uniforms. They then told the locals that they were reinforcements from Sydney sent to protect them from the notorious Kelly Gang.

Later the gang held up the local Bank. More than two thousand pounds was stolen before Kelly and his gang walked to the Telegraph Office and chopped down the telegraph poles. He and his gang held 30 people hostage overnight in the Royal Mail Hotel where Ned Kelly wrote the famous Jerilderie Letter which documents Kelly's passionate pleas of innocence and desires for justice for both his family and the poor Irish settlers of Victoria's north-east. It has also been described as the Ned Kelly 'manifesto' and remains the only source providing a direct link between the Kelly Gang and the actions of which they are accused.

The current Jerilderie Police Station features no less than 19 structural components mimicking Ned Kelly's distinctive face plate. Some examples include walls made of differently toned bricks making up his image to storm drains with holes cut in the same pattern.

=== Sir John Monash ===
Jerilderie is the childhood home of Sir John Monash, honoured military commander whose image adorns the Australian one hundred dollar note. He attended and achieved dux at Jerilderie Public School, a record of which can be seen on a board in the school's head office. The Sir John Monash Memorial Drive, created in his honour, is just off the Newell Highway, just outside the town on the way to Finley.

=== Lord Loudoun ===
In the early 2000s, a medieval scholar, Dr Michael Jones, claimed Queen Elizabeth's claim to the throne was illegitimate because King Edward IV, who reigned from 1461 to 1483, was not of royal blood; he was the illegitimate son of a French archer. Dr Jones concluded that, tracing the correct path, The 14th Earl of Loudoun (usually known simply as Michael Hastings; 1942–2012), who migrated to Jerilderie in the 1960s, was the true King of the United Kingdom and the Commonwealth.

=== Billy Brownless ===
Jerilderie is also the childhood home of former AFL Geelong player Billy Brownless. He is a panelist on The Sunday Footy Show, and is a regular panelist on The Footy Show. He was previously a co-host on the program Morning Glory on radio station SEN 1116, and now he co-hosts The Rush Hour with fellow Footy Show host James Brayshaw a high rating drive program, on radio station Triple M in Melbourne.

== History ==
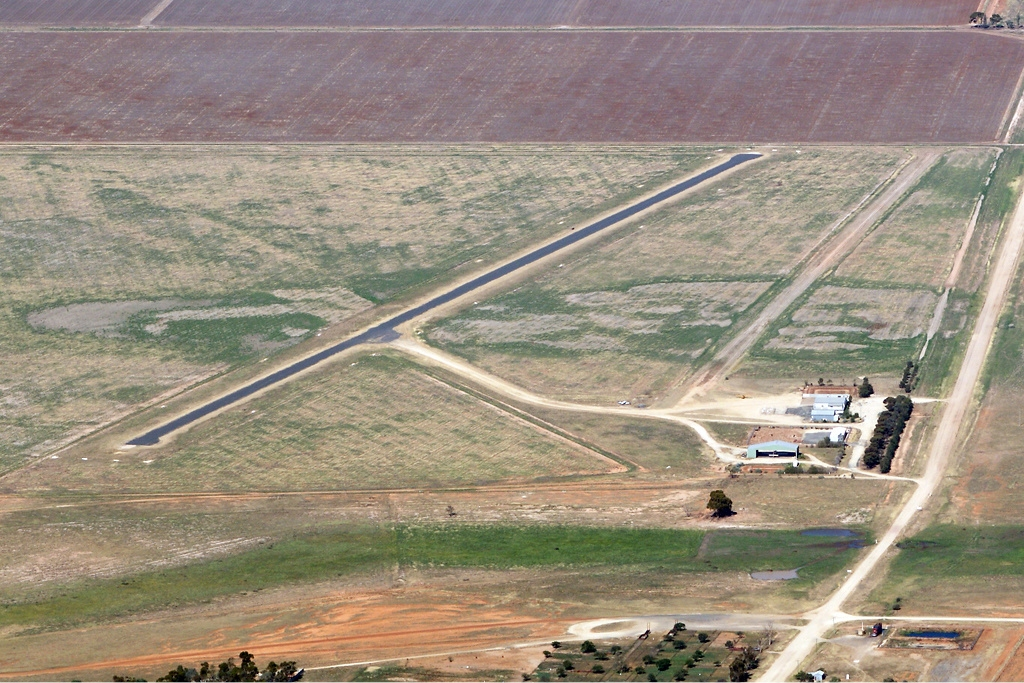
Jerilderie Airport, 2010

Prior to European settlement, the Jerilderie region was inhabited by the Jeithi Aboriginal people, and the name "Jerilderie" is thought to derive from their word for "reedy place".

The Jerilderie district originated with the gazettal of the final licences to landholders in the 1870s. Before then, annual licences were issued. The early European settlers established cattle stations and it was not until the 1860s that sheep were found to be better suited to the area.

The birth of the town of Jerilderie itself is traced to the establishment of a house and store by John Caractacus Powell in 1854. He was apparently encouraged and assisted by the Kennedy family to establish his home and business in what is known today as Powell Street, Jerilderie. The Kennedy family first took up the property known as Mary's Creek Run, the station which surrounded the site of the town of Jerilderie. After John Powell first built, in 1859 William Davidson arrived in Jerilderie and he chose the site of the official village to settle on, being the "Cape" region. He had evidently noted the survey of 1852. William Davidson then constructed a brick kiln, the bricks from which he erected a house, hotel and blacksmith shop.

Thus Jerilderie had two establishments, about three kilometres apart, and the business rivalry was keen in each endeavour to capture trade from the travelling public.

Whilst the rivalry continued between Powell and Davidson, a Mr Cadell settled at a site opposite the existing Police Station and erected a store to compete with Powell and Davidson.

The post office opened on 1 October 1862, although it was spelt Jereelderie until 1890.

No other development occurred for some years but, following an application from Mr Powell in 1863, a surveyor was instructed to survey and report on the Jerilderie Village site. As a consequence of this report, the Village of Jerilderie and suburban boundaries were gazetted on 14 March 1865. The village contained an area of 195 acres (79 ha), bounded generally by West, Coonong, East and Jerilderie Streets.

The railway came to Jerilderie in September 1884 when the New South Wales Government Railways opened a branch line from Narrandera. Jerilderie was the terminus of the line until 1896, when the railway was extended south to Berrigan and, ultimately, to Tocumwal. The station was closed in February 1987. The station complex, including the station building and station master's residence, was added to the New South Wales State Heritage Register on 17 April 2003.

With the continual growth of the town and the development of the sheep and wool industry over the years, there became the need for control and development of local facilities and services such as roads, bridges, water supply, etc. Hence in 1889 the area was introduced to official Local Government with the proclamation of the Jerilderie Municipal Council. The Municipality was originally formed in 1885 from previously formed Progress Association but did not gain official recognition and charter until 1889.

Whilst the town had its Local Government authority, the landholders outside the Municipality found the need to work for the establishment of a Shire Council, and as a result of this need the Wunnamurra Shire Council was realised in 1906.

Both the Jerilderie Municipality and the Wunnamurra Shire continued on their works for the following years up to 1918 when the Shire of Jerilderie was formed from the union of the two Councils. In 2016, the Jerilderie Shire was dissolved to form part of the new Murrumbidgee Council.

== Climate ==
Jerilderie has a cold semi-arid climate (Köppen BSk), characterised by hot summers with pleasant mornings and clear skies, and cool winters with moderate cloud cover. Seasonal range is great across the year.

Temperature data and rainy days are sourced at Urana Post Office, about 50 kilometres (31 mi) to the east, while rainfall data are sourced locally at the Jerilderie Treatment Works.

Climate data for Jerilderie Treatment Works (1914–1975, rainfall 1886–2024); 110 m AMSL; 35.35° S, 145.73° E
Month	Jan	Feb	Mar	Apr	May	Jun	Jul	Aug	Sep	Oct	Nov	Dec	Year
Mean daily maximum °C (°F)	32.9 (91.2)	32.4 (90.3)	29.2 (84.6)	23.6 (74.5)	18.7 (65.7)	14.8 (58.6)	14.2 (57.6)	16.0 (60.8)	19.8 (67.6)	23.5 (74.3)	27.7 (81.9)	31.1 (88.0)	23.7 (74.6)
Mean daily minimum °C (°F)	16.3 (61.3)	16.3 (61.3)	14.0 (57.2)	9.4 (48.9)	6.1 (43.0)	3.6 (38.5)	3.2 (37.8)	4.1 (39.4)	6.3 (43.3)	8.8 (47.8)	11.8 (53.2)	14.6 (58.3)	9.5 (49.2)
Average rainfall mm (inches)	28.7 (1.13)	26.6 (1.05)	30.5 (1.20)	29.1 (1.15)	37.9 (1.49)	39.1 (1.54)	34.6 (1.36)	37.7 (1.48)	34.4 (1.35)	38.9 (1.53)	32.6 (1.28)	31.2 (1.23)	401.0 (15.79)
Average rainy days (≥ 0.2 mm)	3.8	3.5	4.0	4.7	6.5	8.4	8.7	8.6	6.8	6.1	4.8	4.0	69.9
Source 1: Urana Post Office (temperatures and rainy days, 1914–1975)
Source 2: Jerilderie Treatment Works (rainfall, 1886–2024)

== Heritage listings ==
Jerilderie has a number of heritage-listed sites, including:

- Nowranie Street: Jerilderie railway station

=== Rail ===
The Tocumwal railway line is a closed railway line that linked Jerilderie to Narrandera in the north and Tocumwal to the south. The line commenced at Narrandera station and then headed south west to Tocumwal station where there was a break-of-gauge with the Victorian Railways Goulburn Valley line from Shepparton. The line was opened to Jerilderie in 1884, extended to Berrigan in 1896, Finley in 1898 and Tocumwal in 1914. The line was closed south of Jerilderie in 1986 and to the north in 1988.

== Population ==
In the 2016 Census, there were 1,029 people in Jerilderie, 76.4% of people were born in Australia and 82.3% of people spoke only English at home. The most common responses for religion were Catholic 34.1%, Anglican 17.4% and No Religion 15.7%.

== See also ==
- Jerilderie Football Club
- Jerilderie Herald and Urana Advertiser
