= Tocumwal railway line, New South Wales =

Former railway line in New South Wales

Coordinates: 35°09′52″S 146°01′02″E

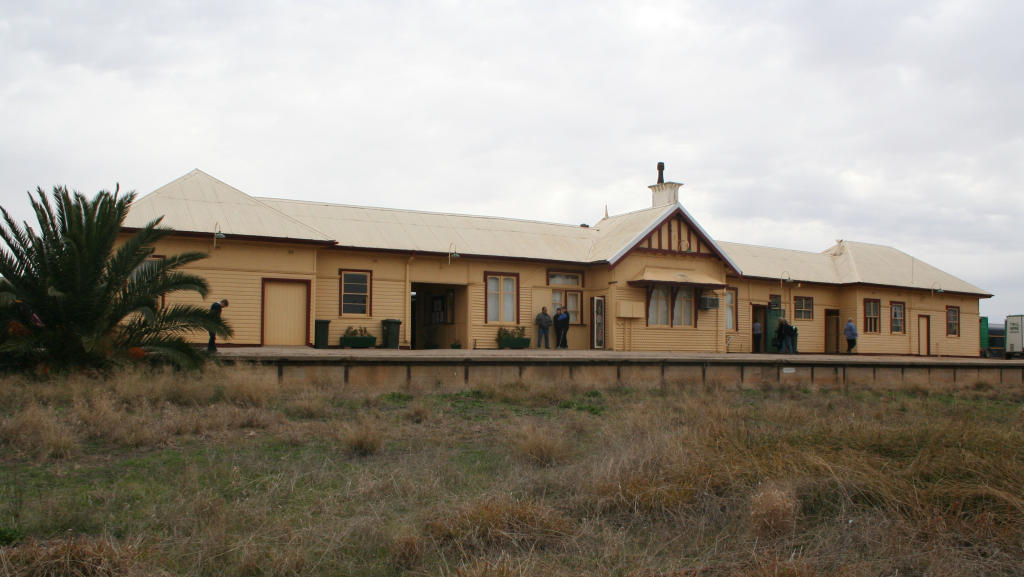
- The NSWGR side of Tocumwal station

Overview
- Other name: Tocumwal railway line
- Status: closed
- Termini: Narrandera; Tocumwal
- Stations: 4

History
- Opened: 1884–July 1908
- Closed: 1988

Technical
- Number of tracks: 1
- Track gauge: 1,435 mm (4 ft 8 1/2 in)

The Tocumwal railway line is a closed railway line in New South Wales, Australia. The line branched from the still open Junee – Hay line at Narrandera station and then headed south west to Tocumwal station where there was a break-of-gauge with the Victorian Railways Goulburn Valley line from Shepparton.

The line was opened to Jerilderie station in 1884, extended to Berrigan in 1896, Finley in 1898 and Tocumwal in 1914. The Victorian line had reached Tocumwal in July 1908.

Two of the stations on the Tocumwal railway line were Widgiewa and Morundah.

The last goods train left Tocumwal for Narrandera in 1985, and traffic ceased over the line south of Jerilderie in September 1986 and the entire line was closed in December 1988. The Victorian line to Tocumwal remains open for freight traffic.

Tocumwal was the site in 1915 of early tests with third-rail devices to enable standard gauge and broad gauge trains to share the same tracks.

In later years passenger services on the line were operated by railcars, connecting with an overnight train at Narrandera. From 1973 the service operated three days per week, until their withdrawal on Saturday 26 November 1983. The final passenger service was a special excursion train operated with a Silver City Comet railcar set on 20 September 1986.

A 2018 report addresses the feasibility of re-opening the line, given that the still-operating line south from Tocumwal could be converted to standard gauge. The report finds that re-opening would not be financially justified although it might be justified on economic or environmental grounds.
