= Tocumwal railway station =

Historic site in New South Wales, Australia

Tocumwal
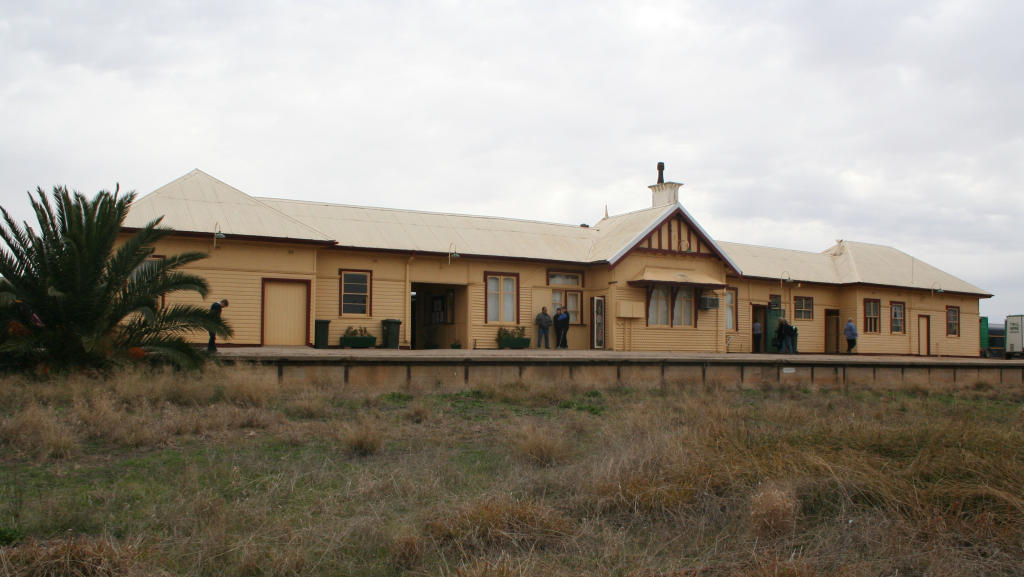
- Station platform from the eastern (disused standard gauge) side

General information
- Coordinates: 35°48′28″S 145°33′27″E
- Owner: Transport Asset Manager of New South Wales
- Lines: Tocumwal (VR); Tocumwal (NSWGR)
- Platforms: 1
- Tracks: 1

Other information
- Status: Freight; Heritage trains (tourism)

History
- Opened: 1908
- Closed: 1983

Services
| Preceding station | Disused railways | Following station |
|---|---|---|
| Mywee | Tocumwal line (VR broad gauge) | Terminus |
| | List of closed railway stations in Victoria | |

NSW Services – Break of Gauge at Tocumwal
| Preceding station | Former services | Following station |
|---|---|---|
| Terminus | Tocumwal Line (NSW Standard Gauge) | Langunyah towards Narrandera |
Location

Tocumwal railway station is a heritage-listed closed railway station in the town of Tocumwal, New South Wales, Australia. It was once the break-of-gauge between the broad gauge Victorian Railways Tocumwal line from the south, and the standard gauge New South Wales Government Railways Tocumwal line from the north. However, only the line from Victoria is still open.

== History ==
Local agitation for a railway to Tocumwal dates as far back as 1899, when a deputation visited Melbourne, with the Minister for Railways supporting the project. The railway line from Strathmerton was opened to the south bank of the Murray River at Tocumwal on 28 February 1905. However, the railway was not extended north into Tocumwal itself and the current station until 1908, due to the lack of agreement between the two state governments. Later, other broad gauge lines into New South Wales were built under the 1922 Border Railways Act.

In April 1906, the Premiers of the two states agreed that Victoria would construct the line and the road bridge over the Murray would be rebuilt to accommodate it. New South Wales would acquire the land for the extension, while the two states would jointly fund the works. Work commenced in 1907 on the short extension, the first train running on 8 July 1908. Facilities included a weighbridge, 53 feet (16 m) long turntable, passenger and goods platform, and goods shed.

New South Wales extended its standard gauge line from Finley southwards to Tocumwal in 1914, providing separate facilities on the eastern side of the station yard. At the time, controversy arose into whether broad or standard gauge track should be used for the extension, with residents north of Tocumwal wanting the break of gauge to be located in their towns.

In 1915, Tocumwal was the site of early tests with third-rail devices to enable standard gauge and broad gauge trains to share the same tracks. While the track was usable, it was not adopted due to its complexity, although other third rail systems have since emerged. In 1941, the New South Wales station platform was removed to make way for gantry cranes, with the platform relocated to the east side of the Victorian building, where it remained until closure. Control and management of the combined station was transferred to the New South Wales Railway department in 1942, Tocumwal having been a Victorian station before that time.

Victorian passenger services to Tocumwal ended on 8 November 1975, with the last train operated by T class diesel locomotive T324 and passenger carriages 3AS–31BE–2AE–22CE. Before that, the Strathmerton – Cobram section of the line was operated as the "branch line", with a 102hp Walker railmotor connecting with the main line train. A bus service was then introduced for the Tocumwal branch, connecting with the Cobram service. By 1977/78, the service between Cobram and Tocumwal was being operated by a VicRail-owned station wagon, driven by the Cobram station master.

The last regular passenger service on the New South Wales line ran three days a week as a railcar shuttle from Narrandera and ceased in November 1983. The last goods train was in June 1986, with traffic officially being cancelled in September 1986. The line was closed in December 1987.

The Victorian line was closed in January 1990, due to bushfire damage to wooden bridges, and was not reopened until February 1995. The same year, Gray's Container Terminal opened in the station yard across from the platform, with regular trains operating to Melbourne, carrying containerised freight. The line has also been a regular destination for heritage passenger trains, run by groups such as the Seymour Railway Heritage Centre.

In 1996, the Berrigan Shire Council obtained a lease over the station building, with a grant of $10,000 made available for restoration work. It is now the site of a small railway museum, managed by the local Lions Club displaying the history of the local area.

== Heritage listing ==
Tocumwal railway station was listed on the New South Wales State Heritage Register on 2 April 1999. The heritage listing of the station and its associated facilities notes that it is a rare building on the New South Wales system, which illustrates the interconnecting of the New South Wales and Victorian systems, and the conflicts, particularly over gauge, that took place over the years. The main value of the building is seen as its location on a section of line that was largely connected to the Victorian system via a combined road and rail bridge. The bridge is assessed as being of very high significance because of its technological value, as well as its importance in the history of transport in the New South Wales and association with interstate rivalries.

== Gallery ==
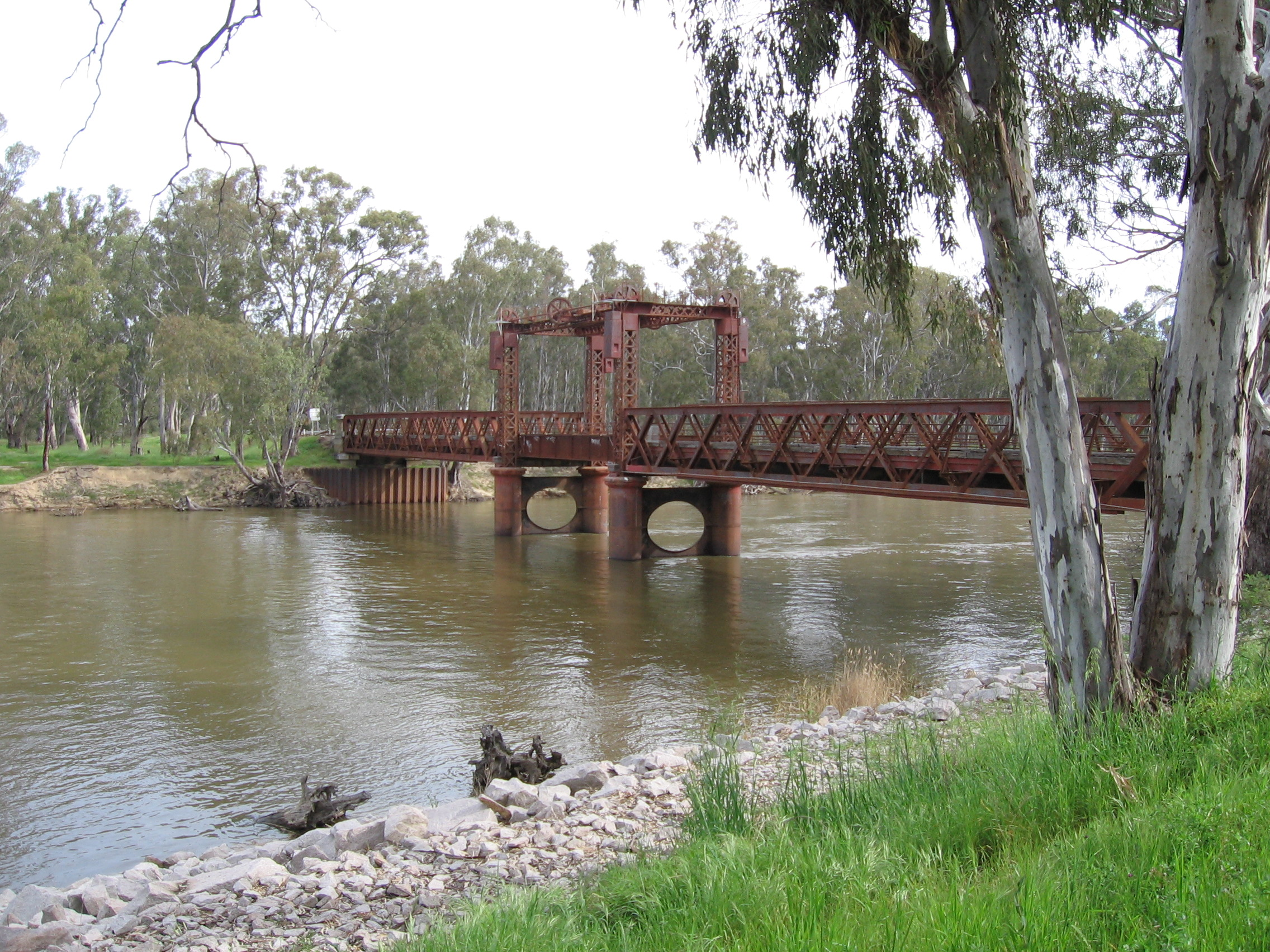
The bridge from the NSW bank

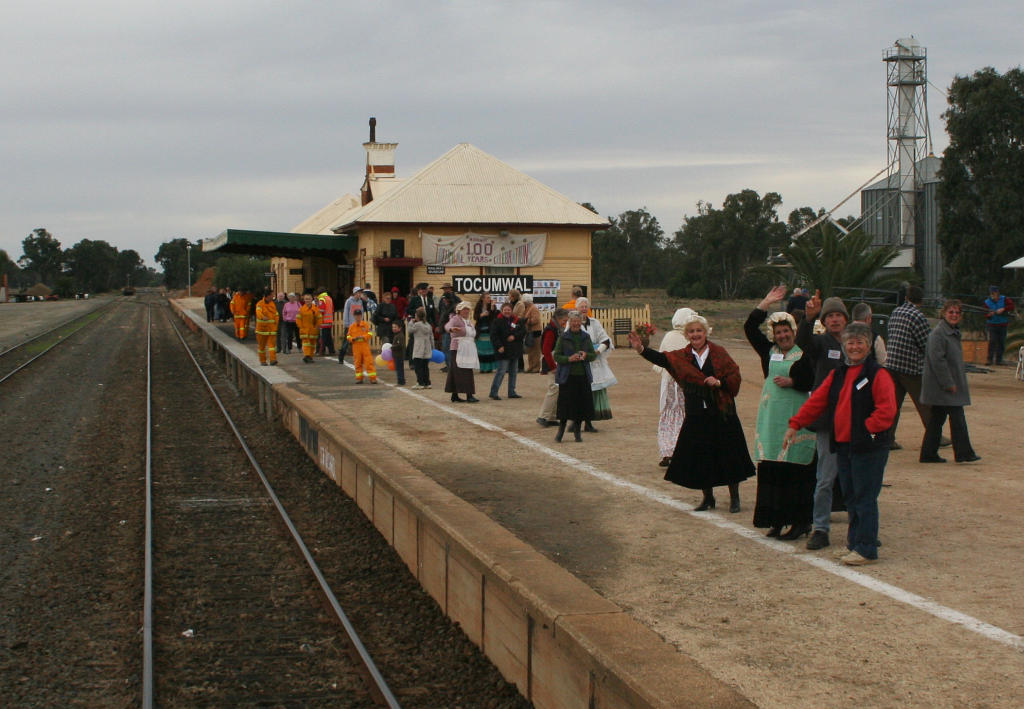
Local residents farewell a centenary train from the Victorian platform in July 2008
