= Galore Hill Scenic Reserve =

Bushland reserve in South Western Slopes, New South Wales, Australia

- Interactive map of Galore Hill Scenic Reserve
- Type: Bushland and recreation reserve
- Location: Fargunyah, New South Wales
- Nearest town: Lockhart
- Coordinates: 35°06′34″S 146°47′00″E
- Area: 510 hectares (5.1 km^{2}; 2.0 mi^{2})
- Elevation: 240 metres (790 ft) - 380 metres (1,250 ft)
- Established: 1968
- Administrator: Lockhart Shire

Galore Hill Scenic Reserve is a bushland reserve, located in the South Western Slopes region of New South Wales, in eastern Australia. The 510-hectare (1,300-acre) reserve is located 12 kilometres (7.5 mi) south of the Sturt Highway between Wagga Wagga and Narrandera, and approximately 12 kilometres (7.5 mi) north of Lockhart.

== History ==
In 1829, explorer Charles Sturt recorded the first European sighting of The Rock (Kengal) and Galore Hill.

Local folklore has it that the early settler Henry Osborne is responsible for Galore Hill's unusual name. Osborne first travelled through the region in 1839, and soon after began to acquire large holdings of land in the area. It is said that after climbing to the top of the hill, Osborne shouted to the world, "There's land enough and galore for me". Galore Hill has been known by this name ever since.

The notorious bushranger Dan Morgan reputedly used the caves on the northern side of Galore Hill in the 1860s as a refuge when he was being hunted by the authorities.

In 1968, Galore Hill was proclaimed a Recreation Reserve, under the management of Lockhart Shire Council.

== Features ==
The reserve is dominated by Galore Hill, which rises 215 metres (705 ft) above the surrounding plains.

A gravel track provides vehicular access to the summit of Galore Hill, whilst another goes to a picnic area called "The Saddle". A children's playground is located at The Saddle, whilst barbeques, picnic facilities and toilets are available at both the summit and The Saddle.

A lookout tower at the summit provides panoramic views of the surrounding landscape.

=== Walking trails ===
Morgans Caves Loop trail starts at the summit and traverses along the northern side of Galore Hill, providing views of the surrounding plains. The trail also passes the caves believed to be used by the bushranger Dan Morgan to avoid the authorities. Morgans Caves Loop takes approximately 45 minutes to complete.

The Saddle Loop Trail links the picnic area at The Saddle to the viewing tower and picnic area at the summit. The walk features views of The Rock to the east, and takes approximately 45 minutes to complete.

== Environment ==
=== Flora ===
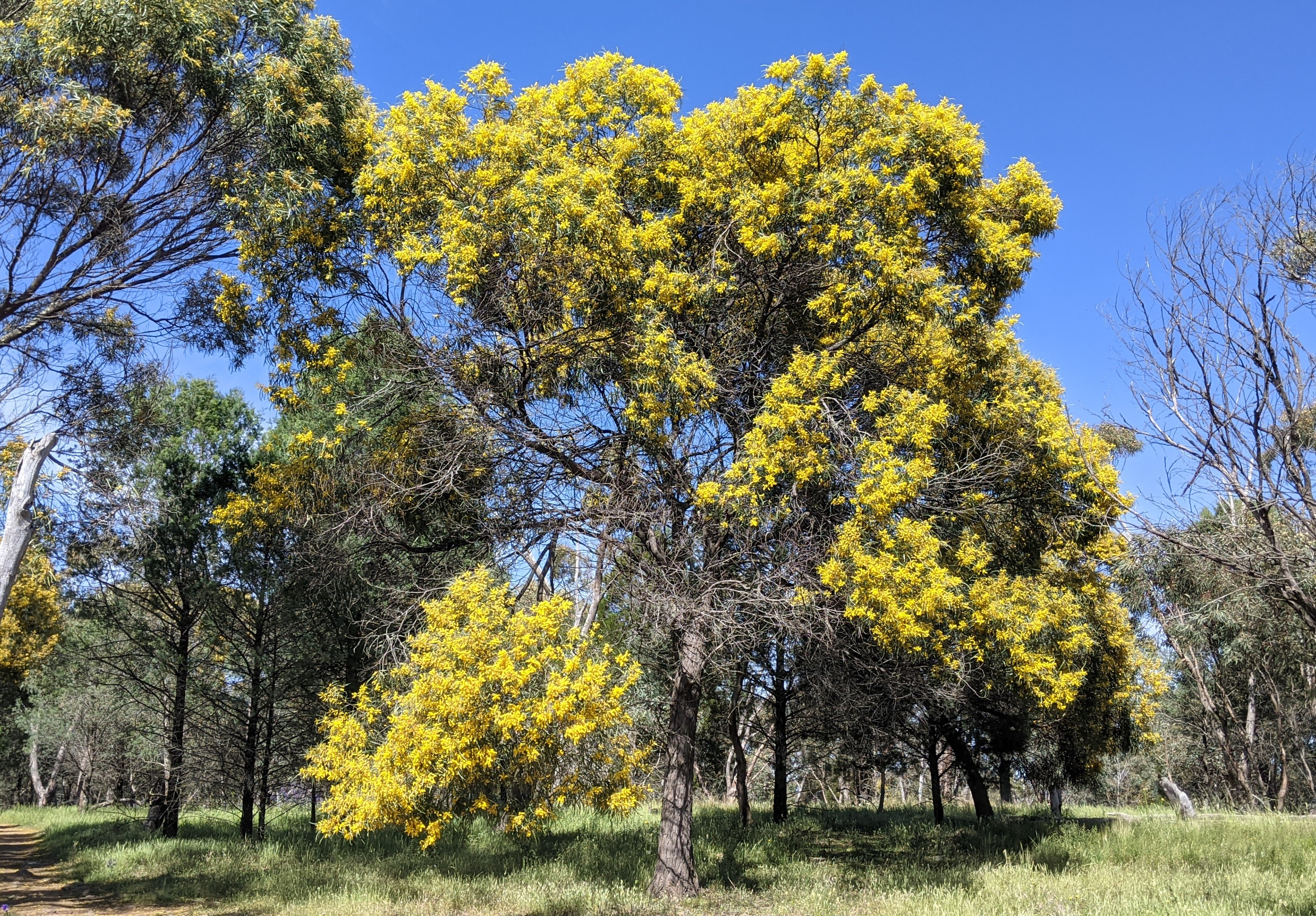
Flowering Currawang, Galore Hill Scenic Reserve

190 plant species have been recorded within the reserve, of which 143 were native, and 47 were introduced. Large tree species present within the reserve include black cypress pine, white cypress pine, grey box, yellow box, Blakely's red gum, bulloak and drooping sheoak. Shrubs present in the reserve include native cherry, currawang, Deane's wattle, showy wattle, golden wattle, common fringe-myrtle and seven dwarfs grevillea.

Other plants found in the reserve include small vanilla lily, bulbine lily, showy isotome, waxlip orchid, dusky fingers, smooth flax lily, creeping saltbush, climbing saltbush, purple coral pea, Austral indigo, sticky everlasting and creamy candles.

=== Fauna ===
84 species of birds, four species of mammals and three species of reptiles have been recorded within the reserve. Birds recorded at Galore Hill include glossy black cockatoo, white-throated treecreeper, brown treecreeper, woodswallows, eastern rosella, and restless flycatcher. Mammals recorded in the reserve include eastern grey kangaroo, wallabies and short-beaked echidna.

Reptiles known to occur in the reserve include tree dtella and nobbi dragon.

== Gallery ==
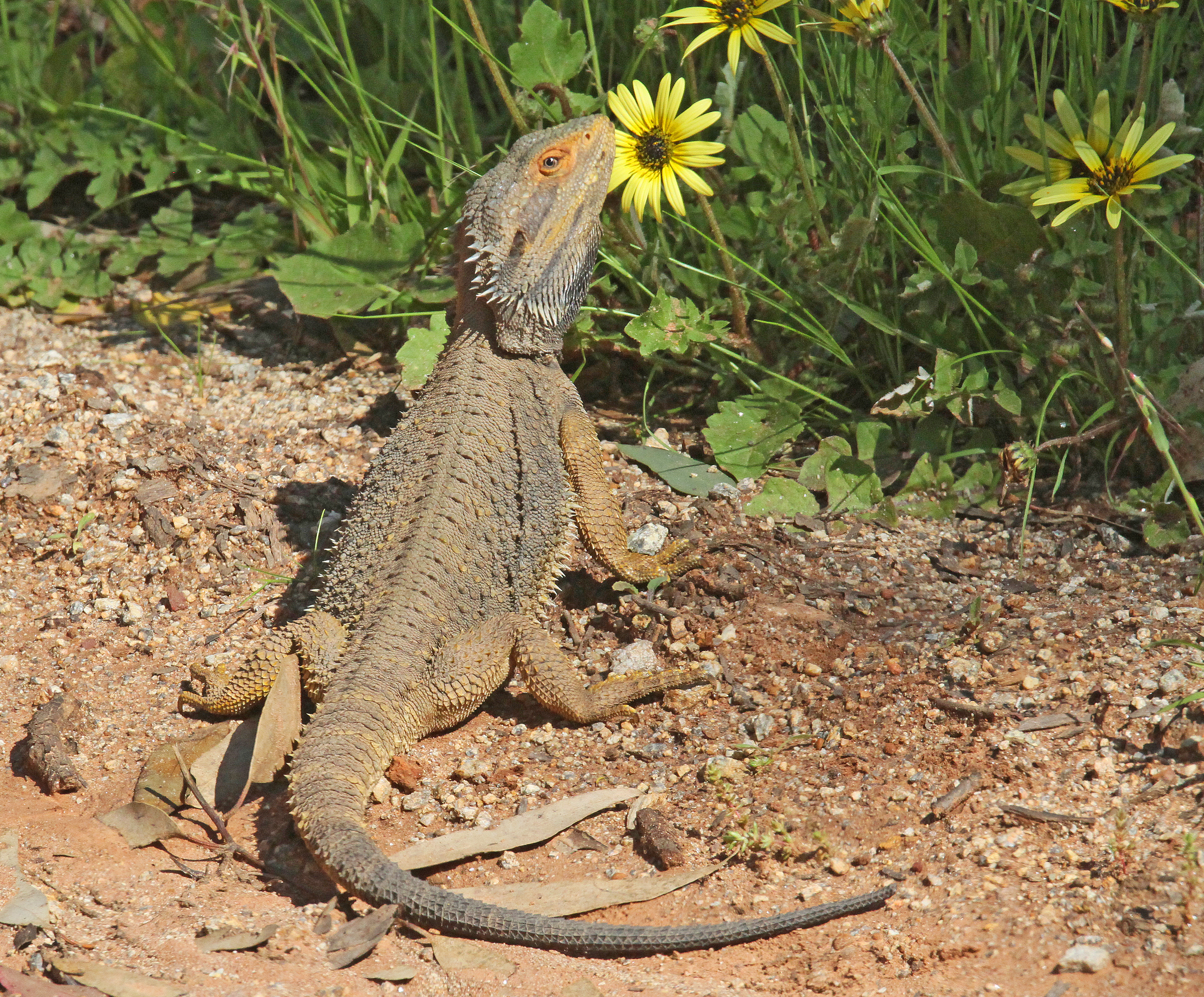
Bearded Dragon, Galore Hill Scenic Reserve

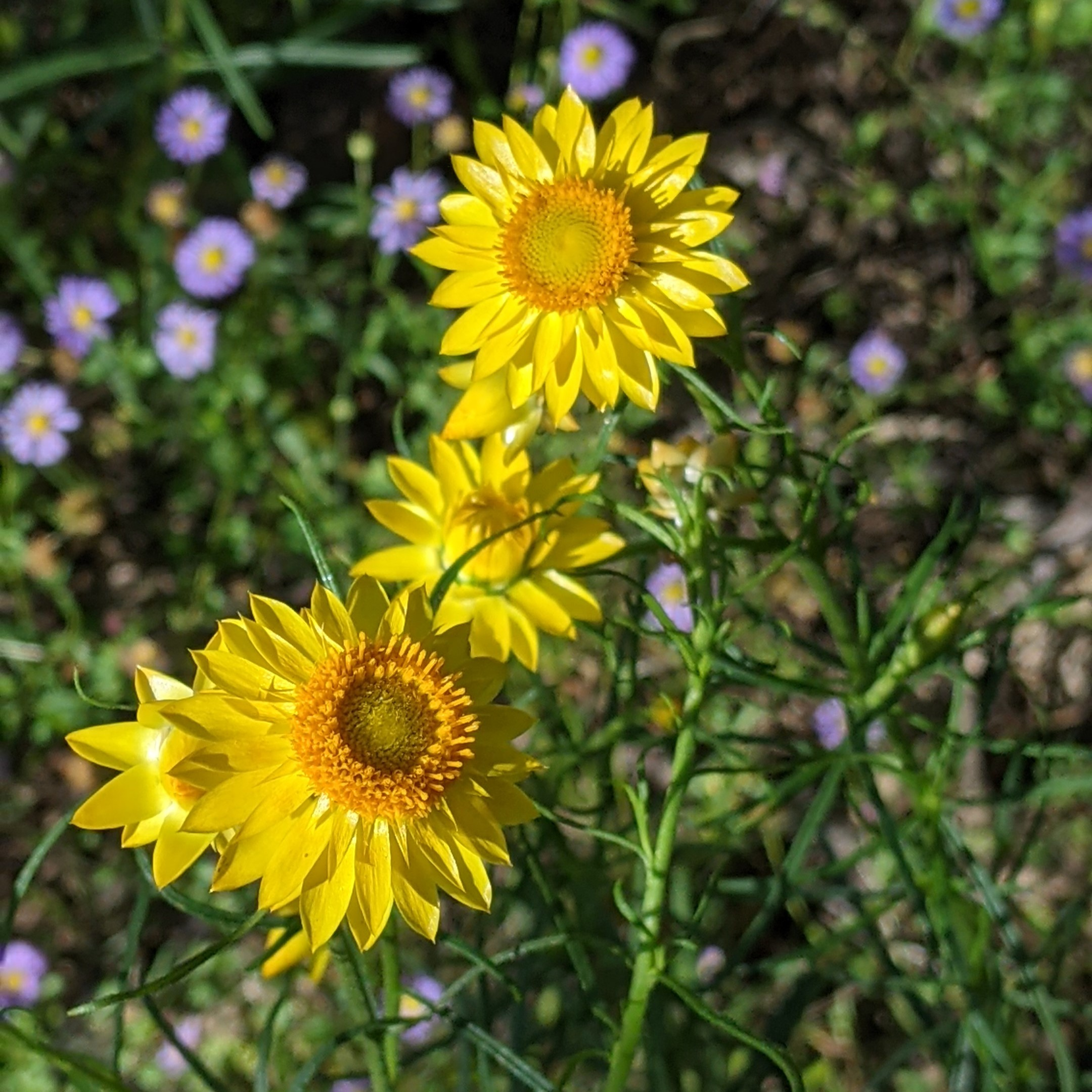
Sticky everlasting, Galore Hill Scenic Reserve

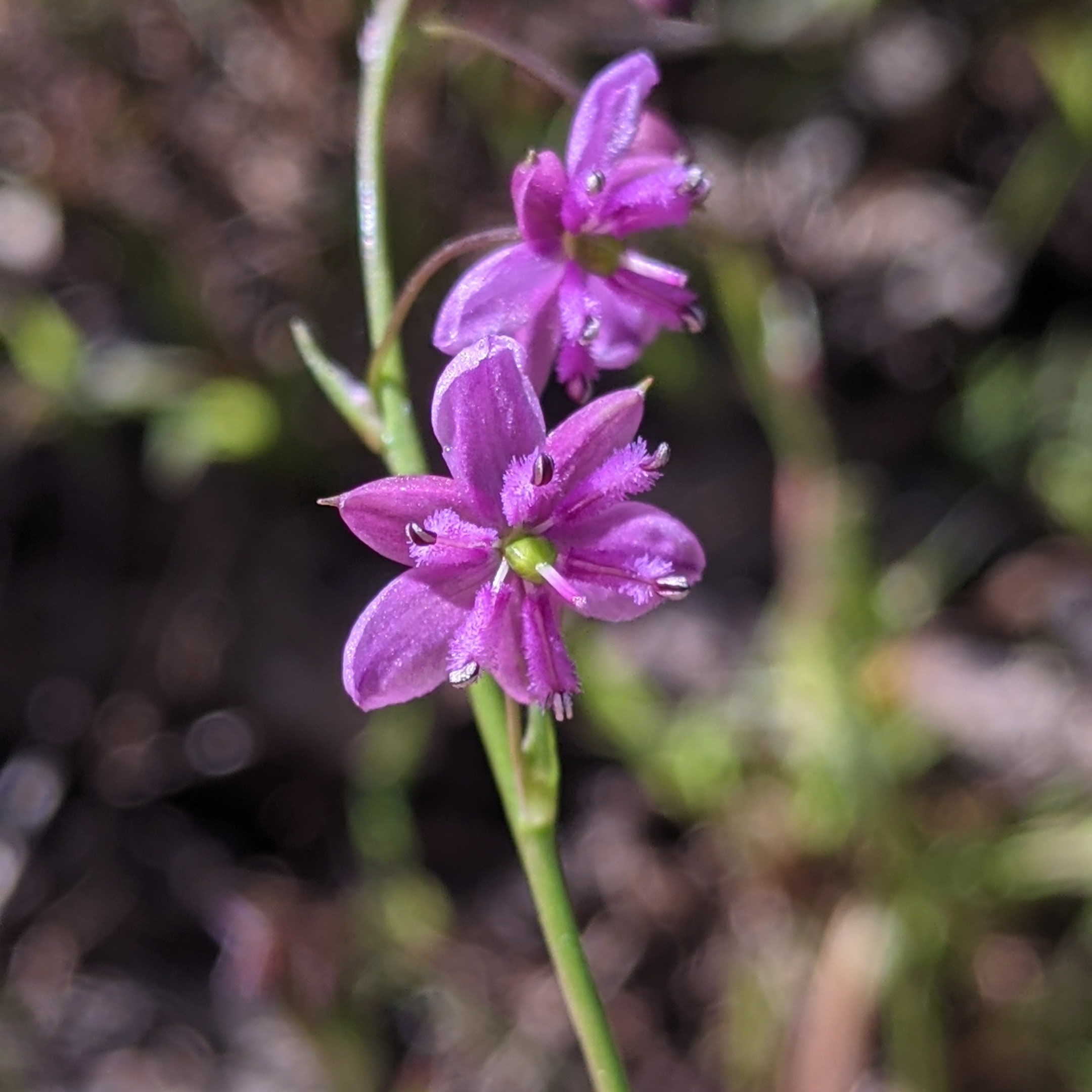
small vanilla lily, Galore Hill Scenic Reserve
