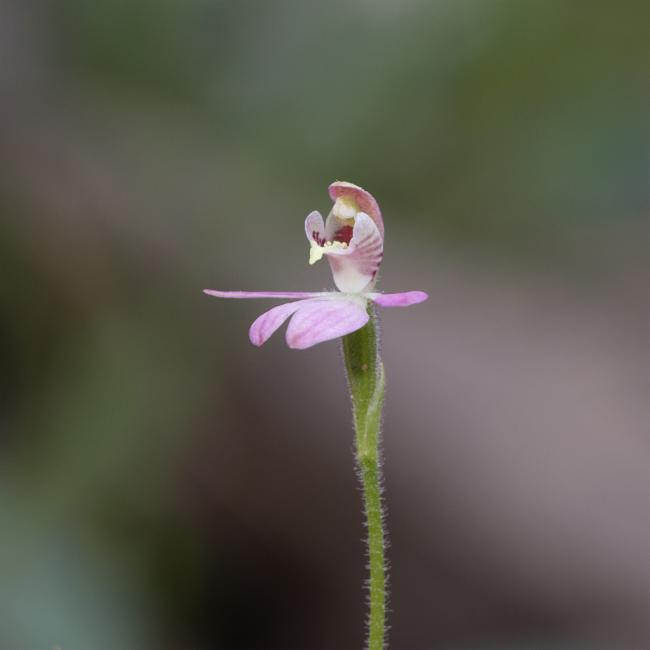
- In Scott Creek Conservation Park

Scientific classification
- Kingdom: Plantae
- Clade: Embryophytes
- Clade: Tracheophytes
- Clade: Spermatophytes
- Clade: Angiosperms
- Clade: Monocots
- Order: Asparagales
- Family: Orchidaceae
- Subfamily: Orchidoideae
- Tribe: Diurideae
- Genus: Caladenia
- Species: C. pygmaea

Binomial name
- Caladenia pygmaea (R.S.Rogers) R.J.Bates

Synonyms
- Caladenia carnea var. pygmaea R.S.Rogers

= Caladenia pygmaea =

Pygmy finger orchid

Species of orchid

Caladenia pygmaea, commonly known as the pygmy finger orchid, is a plant in the orchid family Orchidaceae and is endemic to South Australia. It is a ground orchid with a single erect, sparsely hairy leaf and a single pink flower with red stripes on the labellum. It was formerly known as a variety of Caladenia carnea.

== Description ==
Caladenia pygmaea, is a terrestrial, perennial, deciduous, herb with an underground tuber and a single erect, sparsely hairy leaf, 20–30 mm long and 2–3 mm wide. A single flower 5–6 mm wide is borne on a spike 50–100 mm high. The sepals and petals are pale pink on the front and pale green and slightly hairy on the back. The dorsal sepal is 2.5–3 mm long, about 2 mm wide and curves forward forming a hood over the column. The lateral sepals and petals are about the same size as the dorsal sepal, with the petals spreading and the lateral sepals parallel to and often touching each other along their length. The labellum is about 3 mm long and 2 mm wide, pink or white with red bars. The sides of the labellum turn upwards and almost surround the column and the tip is a small yellow triangle with a few blunt teeth on its sides. Flowering occurs in October.

== Taxonomy and naming ==
The pygmy finger orchid was first formally described in 1927 by Richard Sanders Rogers who gave it the name Caladenia carnea var. pygmaea. In 2014 Robert Bates changed the name to Caladenia pygmaea and published the change in Australian Orchid Review. The specific epithet (pygmaea) is a Latin word meaning "dwarf" or "pygmy".

== Distribution and habitat ==
Caladenia pygmaea occurs in the south-east of South Australia where it grows in hard, but well-drained soil in woodland.
