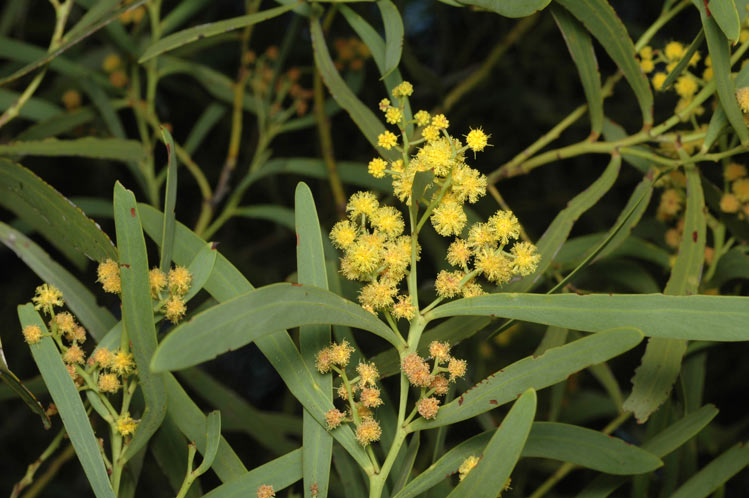

Scientific classification
- Kingdom: Plantae
- Clade: Tracheophytes
- Clade: Angiosperms
- Clade: Eudicots
- Clade: Rosids
- Order: Fabales
- Family: Fabaceae
- Subfamily: Caesalpinioideae
- Clade: Mimosoid clade
- Genus: Acacia
- Species: A. difformis

Binomial name
- Acacia difformis R.T.Baker
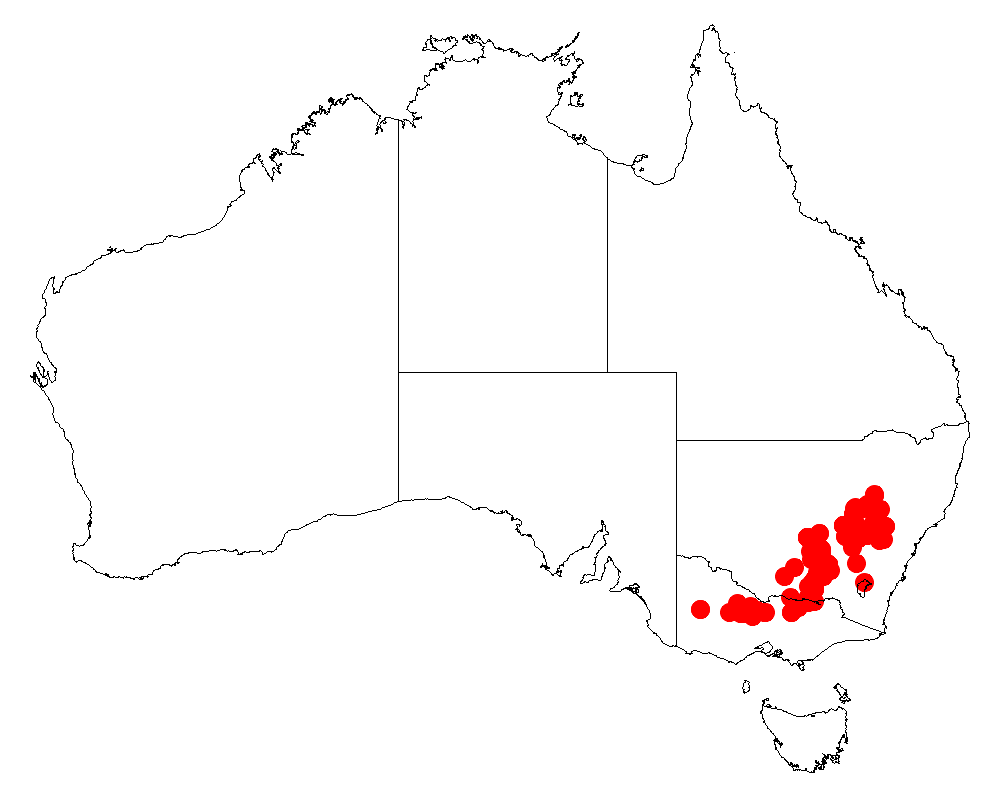
- Occurrence data from AVH

Synonyms
- Racosperma difforme (R.T.Baker) Pedley

= Acacia difformis =

Drooping wattle

Species of legume

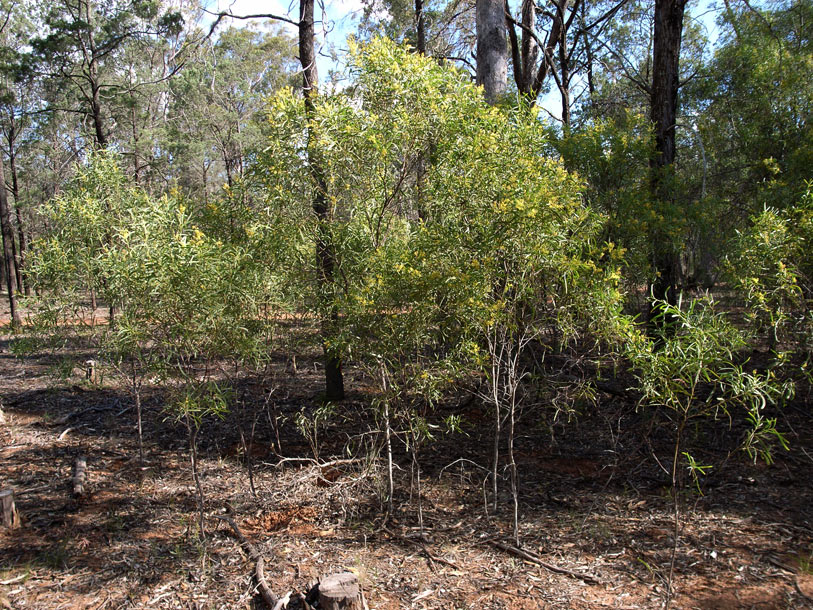
Habit in Milbrulong State Forest

Acacia difformis commonly known as drooping wattle, Wyalong wattle or mystery wattle is a species of flowering plant in the family Fabaceae and is endemic to continental south-eastern Australia. It is a shrub or rounded tree that often forms suckers and has narrowly lance-shaped to narrowly elliptic or linear phyllodes, spherical heads of light golden yellow flowers and pods that are thinly leathery to crusty, and more or less resemble a string of beads.

== Description ==
Acacia difformis is an irregularly formed shrub or rounded tree that typically grows to a height of 2–7 m (6 ft 7 in – 23 ft 0 in) and often forms suckers, leading to thickets. Its branchlets are reddish brown and glabrous. The phyllodes are often pendulous, narrowly lance-shaped with the narrower end towards the base, or narrowly elliptic or linear, straight to shallowly curved down, mostly 60–160 mm (2.4–6.3 in) long, 5–15 mm (0.20–0.59 in) wide and glabrous with a prominent midvein. There are one or two glands up to 30 mm (1.2 in) above the base of the phyllodes. The flowers are borne in spherical heads in 8 to 25 racemes 10–60 mm (0.39–2.36 in) long on glabrous peduncles 3–6 mm (0.12–0.24 in) long, each head with 20 to 35 light golden yellow flowers. Flowering often occurs from January and February, sometimes between June and September, and the pods are thinly leathery to crusty, up to 200 mm (7.9 in) long and 4–6 mm (0.16–0.24 in) wide and more or less resemble a string of beads. The seeds are oblong to elliptic, 6.5–8 mm (0.26–0.31 in) long and dark brown with a club-shaped aril.

== Taxonomy ==
Acacia difformis was first formally described in 1897 by Richard Baker in the Proceedings of the Linnean Society of New South Wales. The specific epithet (difformis) means 'irregularly or unevenly or differently formed', apparently referring to Baker's comments about "broad' and 'narrow' phyllodes.

== Distribution and habitat ==
Drooping wattle grows in sandy soils, usually in mallee communities or open forest on the inland slopes of the Great Dividing Range from Cobar and Merrygoen in New South Wales to Dimboola in Victoria.

== See also ==
- List of Acacia species
