= Tootool, New South Wales =

Tootool New South Wales
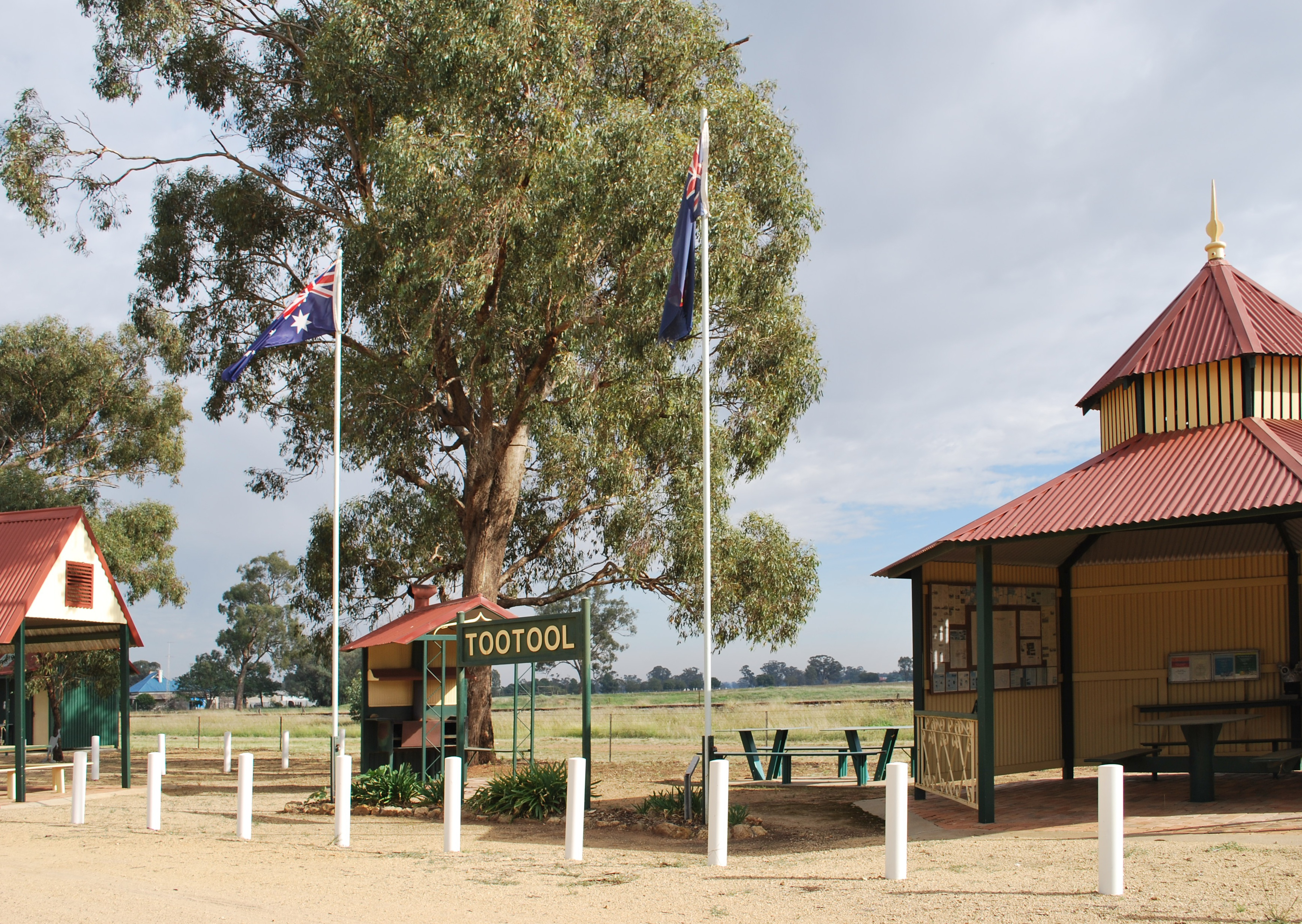
- Tootool rest area

- Coordinates: 35°11′14″S 146°58′27″E
- Population: 51 (SAL 2021)
- Postcode(s): 2655
- Elevation: 188 m (617 ft)
- Location: 4 km (2 mi) from French Park; 16 km (10 mi) from The Rock
- LGA(s): Lockhart Shire
- County: Mitchell
- State electorate(s): Wagga Wagga

Tootool is a rural community in the central east part of the Riverina. It is situated by road, about 4 kilometres east of French Park and 16 kilometres west of The Rock.

Tootool Post Office opened on 1 August 1901 and closed in 1966.

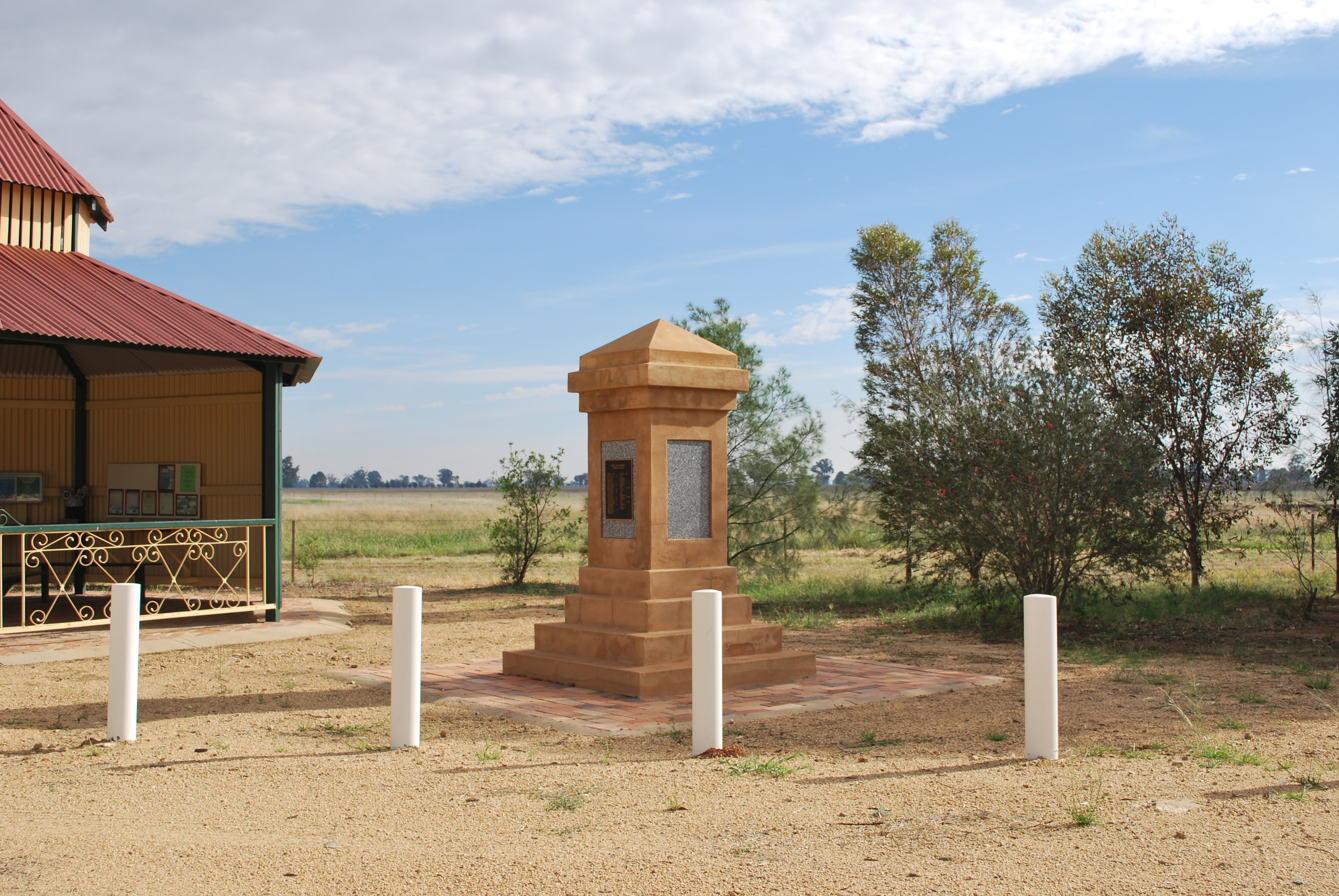
War memorial

== Notes and references ==
Preceding station	Former services	Following station
French Park towards Oaklands	Oaklands Line	The Rock Terminus
