= French Park =

French Park may refer to:

- French Park, New South Wales, rural village community in Riverina, New South Wales, Australia
- French Park (Amberley, Ohio), public park in Amberley, Ohio, United States
- Frenchpark, a village in County Roscommon, Ireland
- Fuxing Park, public park in Shanghai, China, before 1943 known as "French Park" by locals
