= Saltbush =

Saltbush is a vernacular plant name that most often refers to Atriplex, a genus of about 250 plants distributed worldwide from subtropical to subarctic regions. Atriplex species are native to Australia, North and South America, and Eurasia. Many Atriplex species are halophytes and are adapted to dry environments with salty soils.

The genus Chenopodium is taxonomically a cousin of the genus Atriplex. Certain chenopodiums may be called saltbushes, including C. robertianum and C. nutans.

Sarcobatus vermiculatus, native to North America, is a halophyte plant, and is sometimes informally called a saltbush.

Plants called saltbush
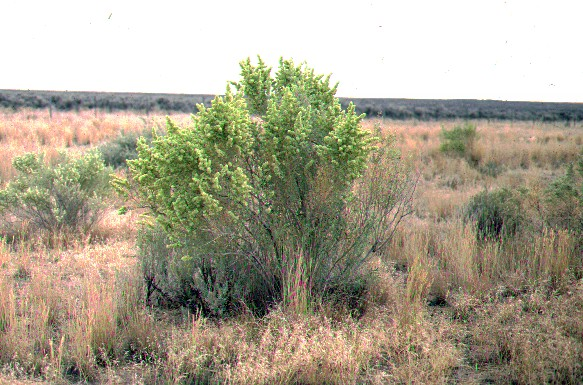
Four-winged saltbush (Atriplex canescens)

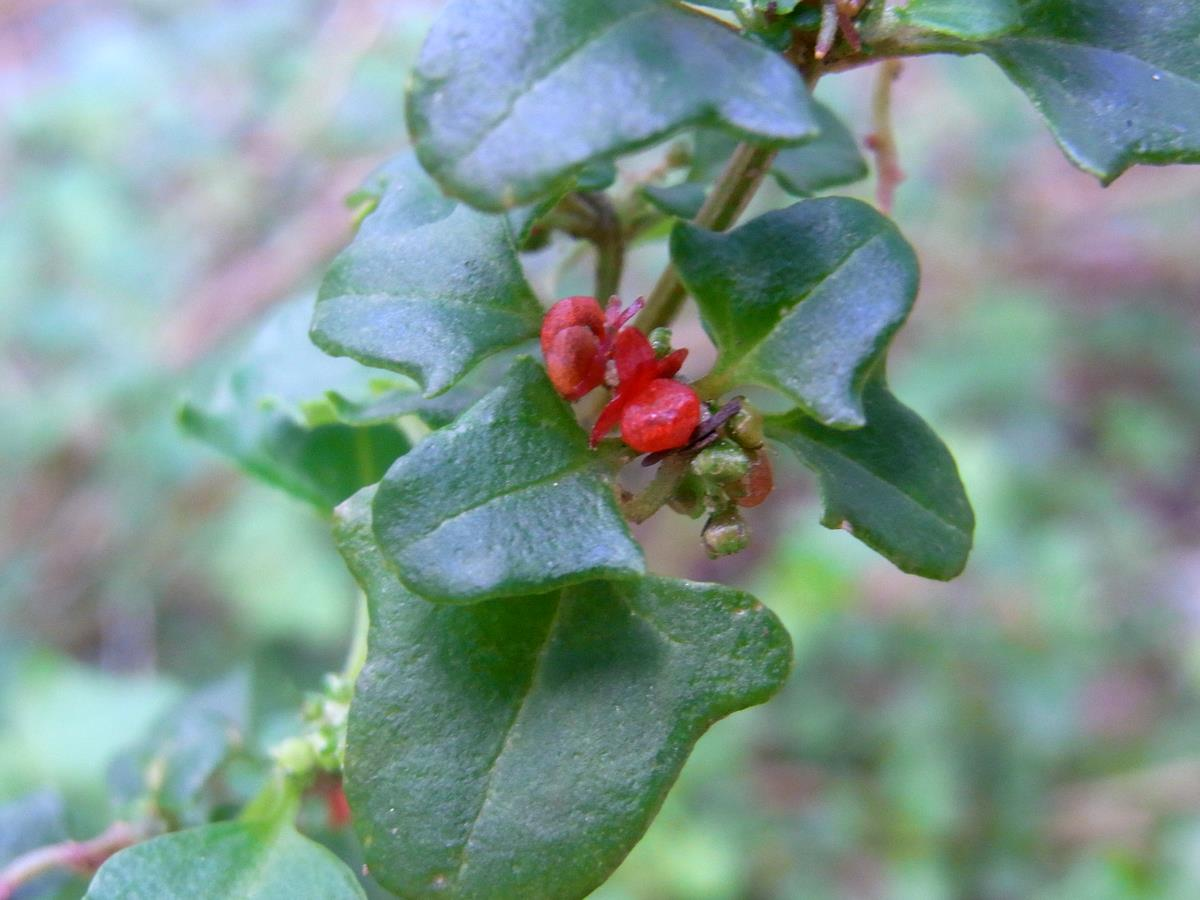
Chenopodium robertianum berries

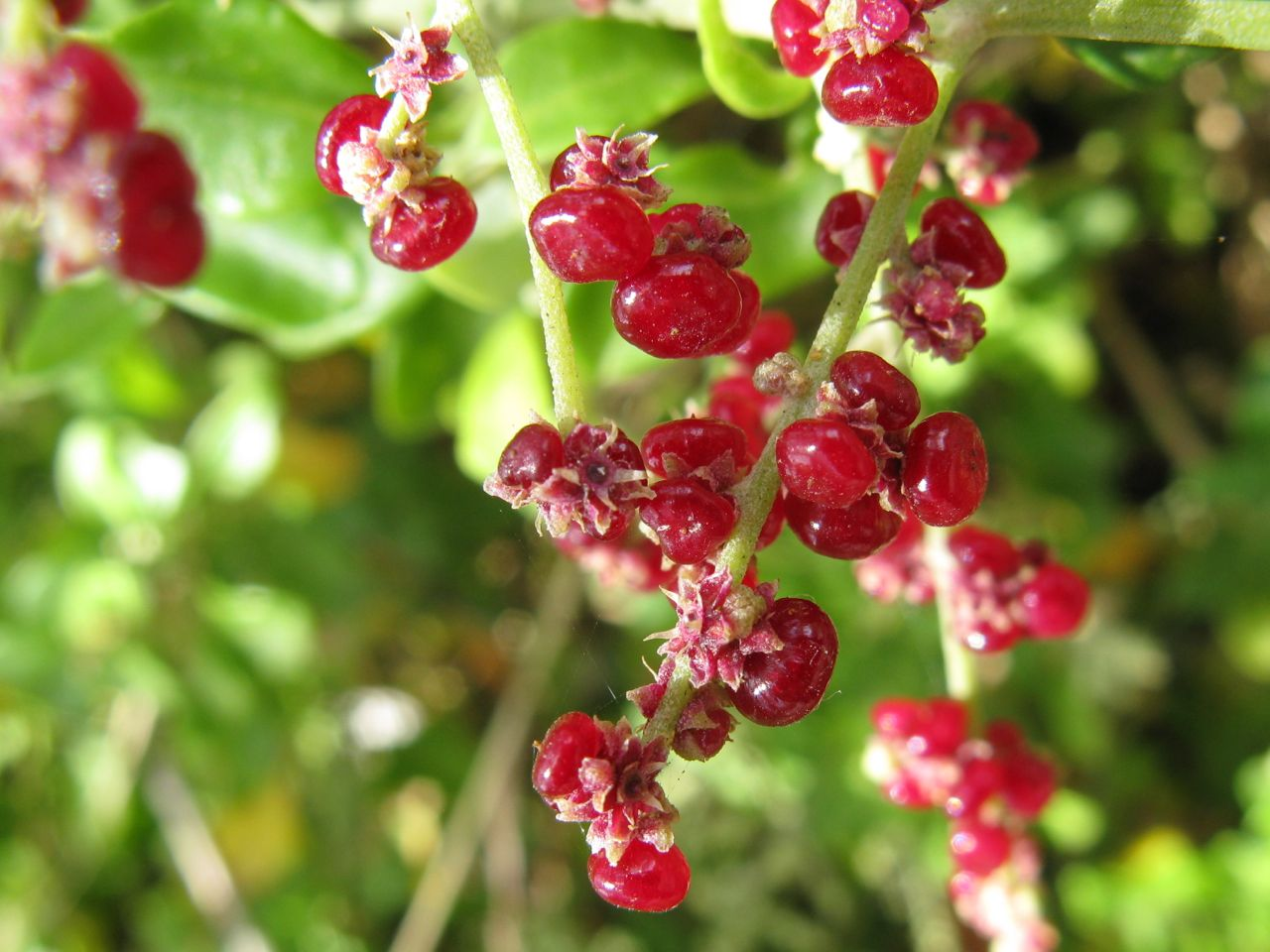
Chenopodium nutans berries

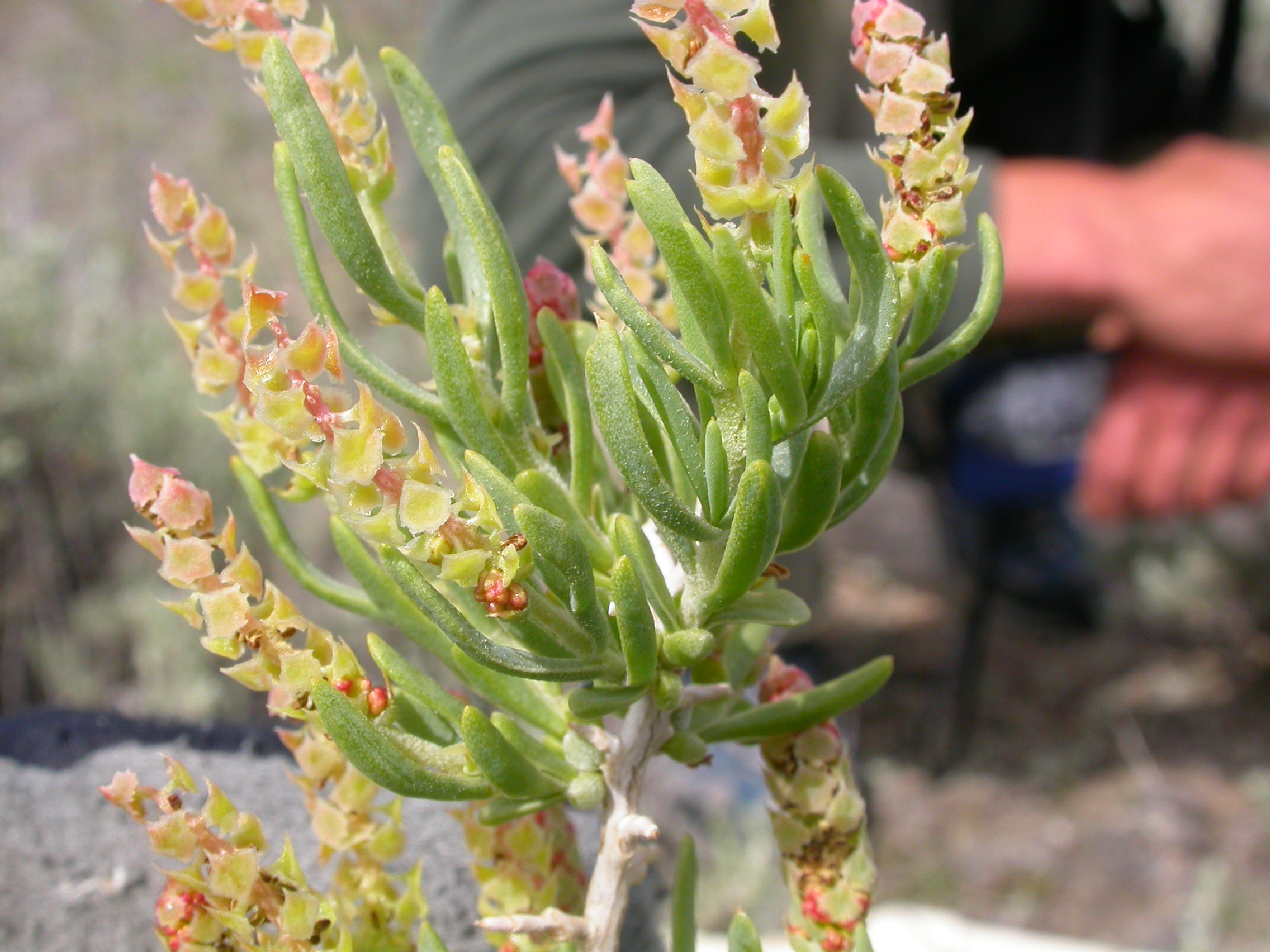
Cone-like structures containing the female flowers of Sarcobatus vermiculatus

== See also ==
- Saltwort, a class of flowering plants that are tolerant of salty soils
- Barrier saltbush, Enchylaena
