= Milbrulong State Forest =

State forest in New South Wales, Australia

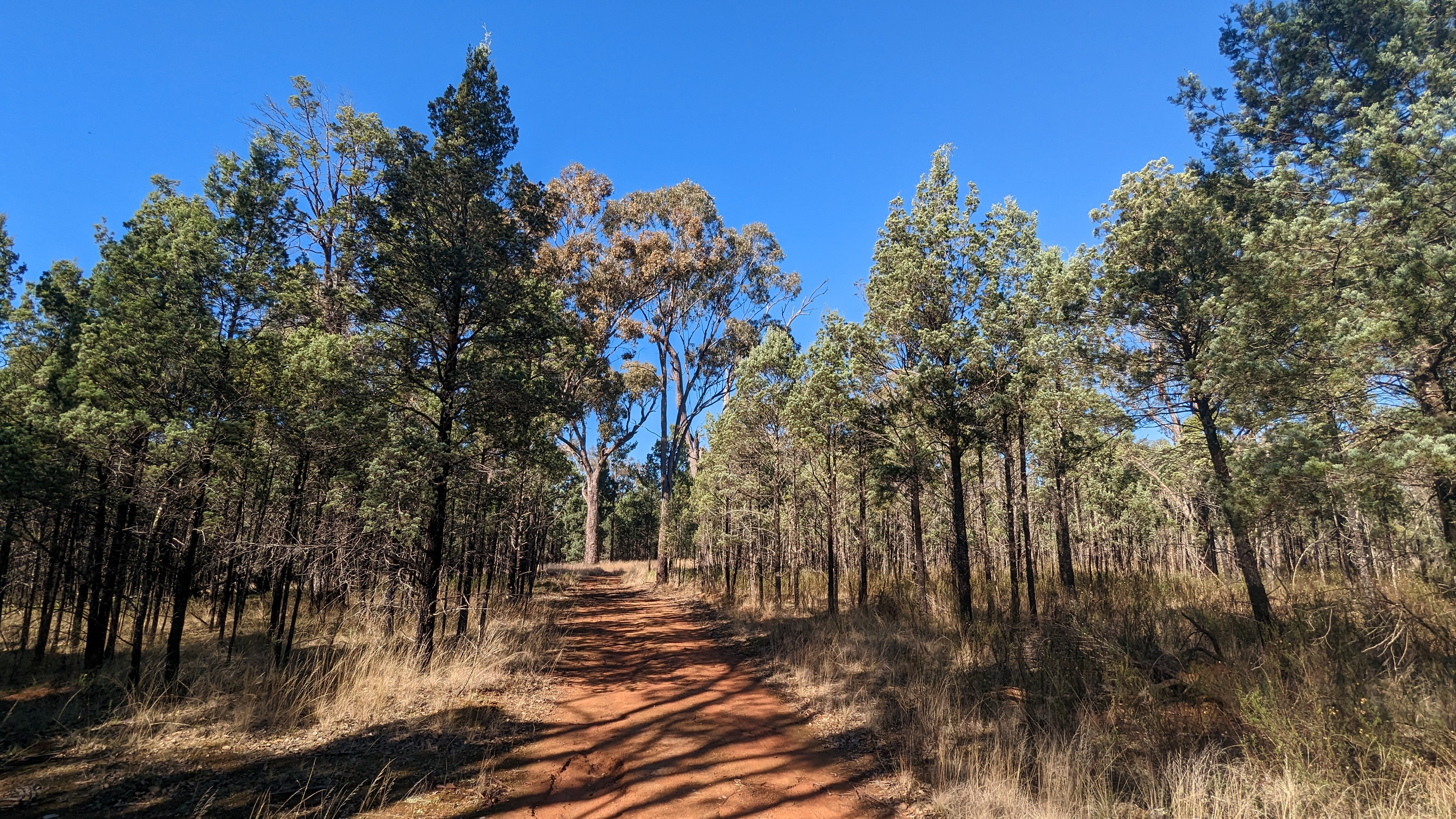
- Interactive map of Milbrulong State Forest

Geography
- Location: South Western Slopes, New South Wales, Australia
- Coordinates: 35°18′00″S 146°55′54″E
- Elevation: 200 metres (660 ft) - 225 metres (738 ft)
- Area: 376 hectares (3.8 km^{2}; 1.5 mi^{2})

Administration
- Authority: Forestry Corporation of NSW

Ecology
- Dominant tree species: White cypress pine
- Lesser flora: White box, yellow box, bulloak, wedge-leaf hop-bush, Acacia sp., sticky everlasting

Milbrulong State Forest is a native forest, located in the South Western Slopes region of New South Wales, in eastern Australia. The 376-hectare (930-acre) state forest consists of two sections located 12.5 kilometres (7.8 mi) apart, with the largest (approx. 355 hectares) located 9 kilometres (5.6 mi) east of Milbrulong, and the smaller section (approx. 20 hectares) is located 10 kilometres (6.2 mi) north-west of The Rock.

== Etymology ==
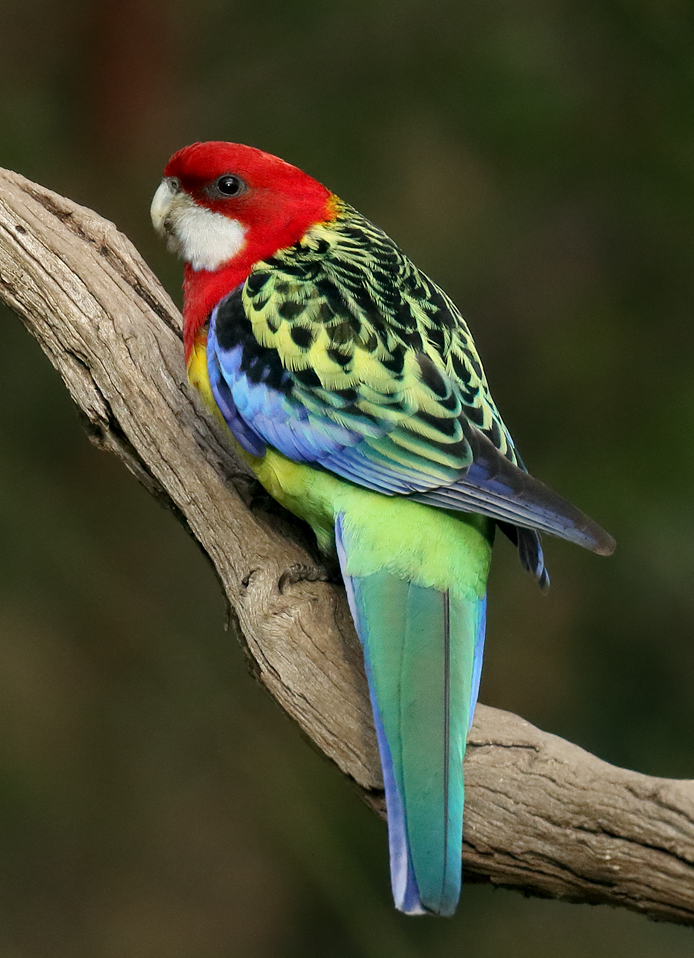
Eastern rosella

The place name Milbrulong is derived from the local Wiradjuri word mulbirrang meaning "rosella parrot".

== Environment ==
=== Flora ===
127 plant species have been recorded within the state forest, of which 90 were native, and 37 were introduced. At least 95 percent of the forest within the state forest is dominated by white cypress pine. Other large tree species present within the forest include white box, yellow box and bulloak.

Native plant species recorded within the state forest include rock fern, nodding chocolate lily, bulbine lily, dusky fingers, smooth flax lily, Australian bluebell, climbing saltbush, spreading eutaxia, hakea wattle, golden wattle, native cherry and creamy candles.

=== Fauna ===
At least 22 species listed under the Biodiversity Conservation Act 2016 have been recorded within the state forest. This includes several bird species, such as the brown treecreeper, flame robin and hooded robin.

== Gallery ==
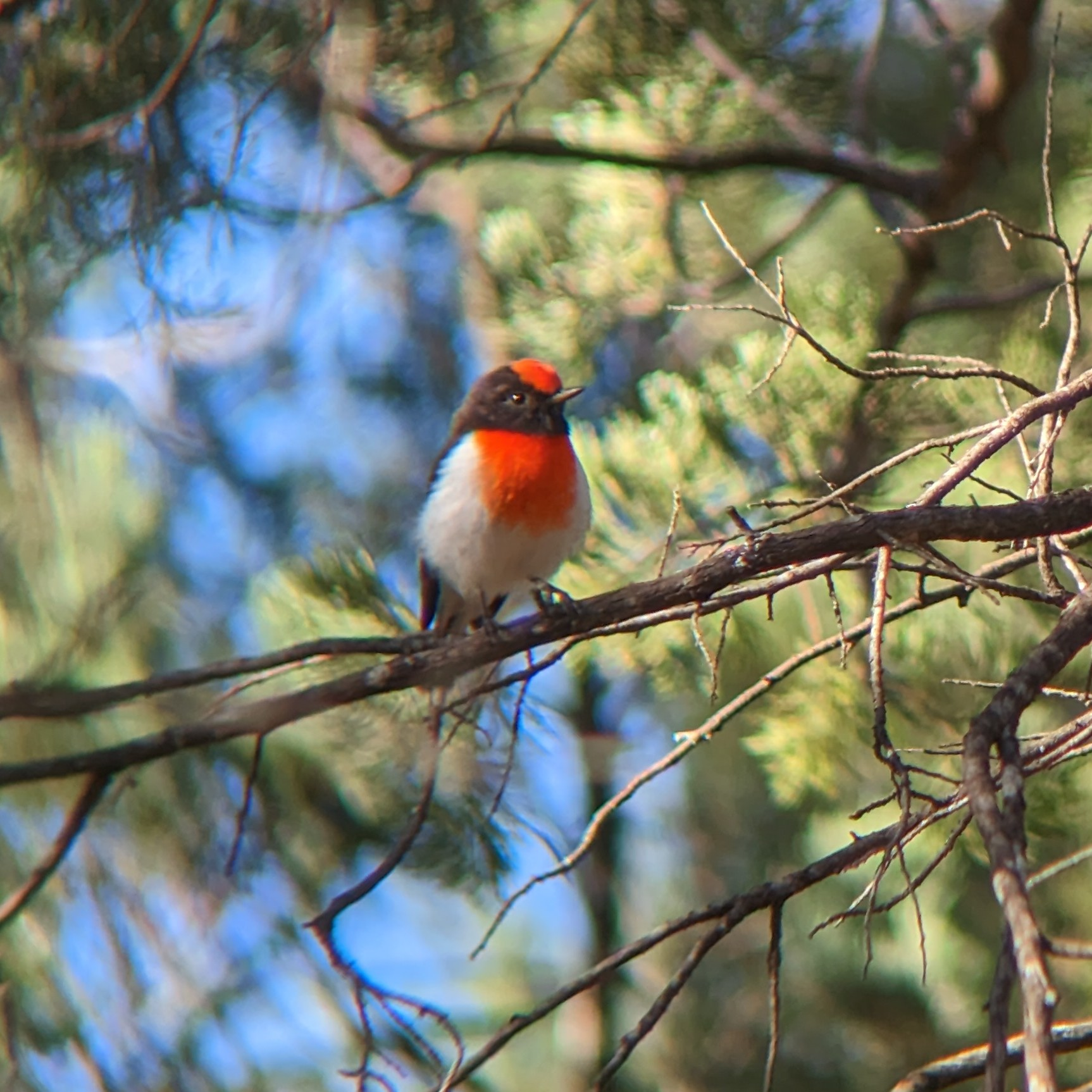
Red-capped robin, Milbrulong State Forest

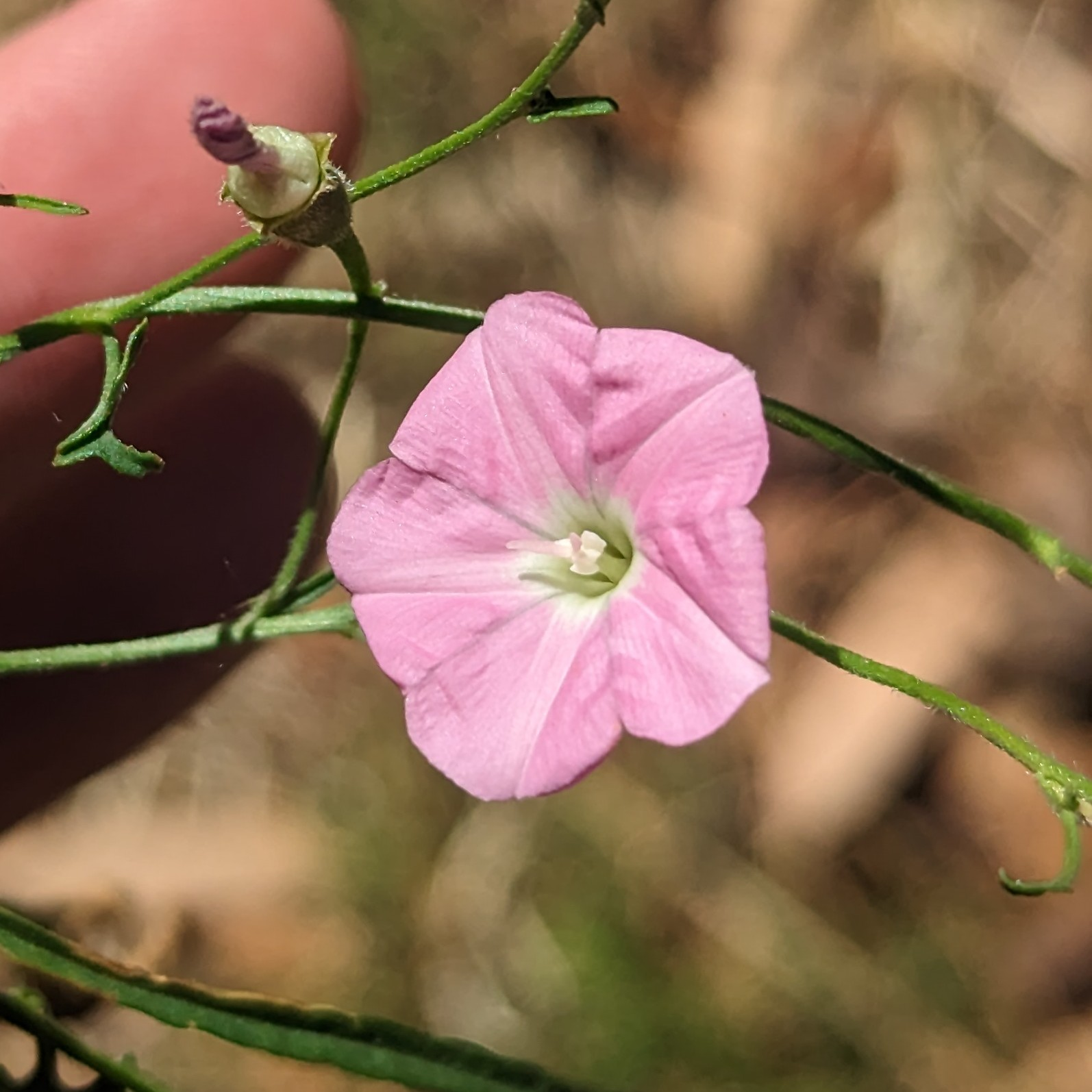
Australian bindweed, Milbrulong State Forest

== See also ==
- State Forests of New South Wales
