= French Park, New South Wales =

French Park New South Wales
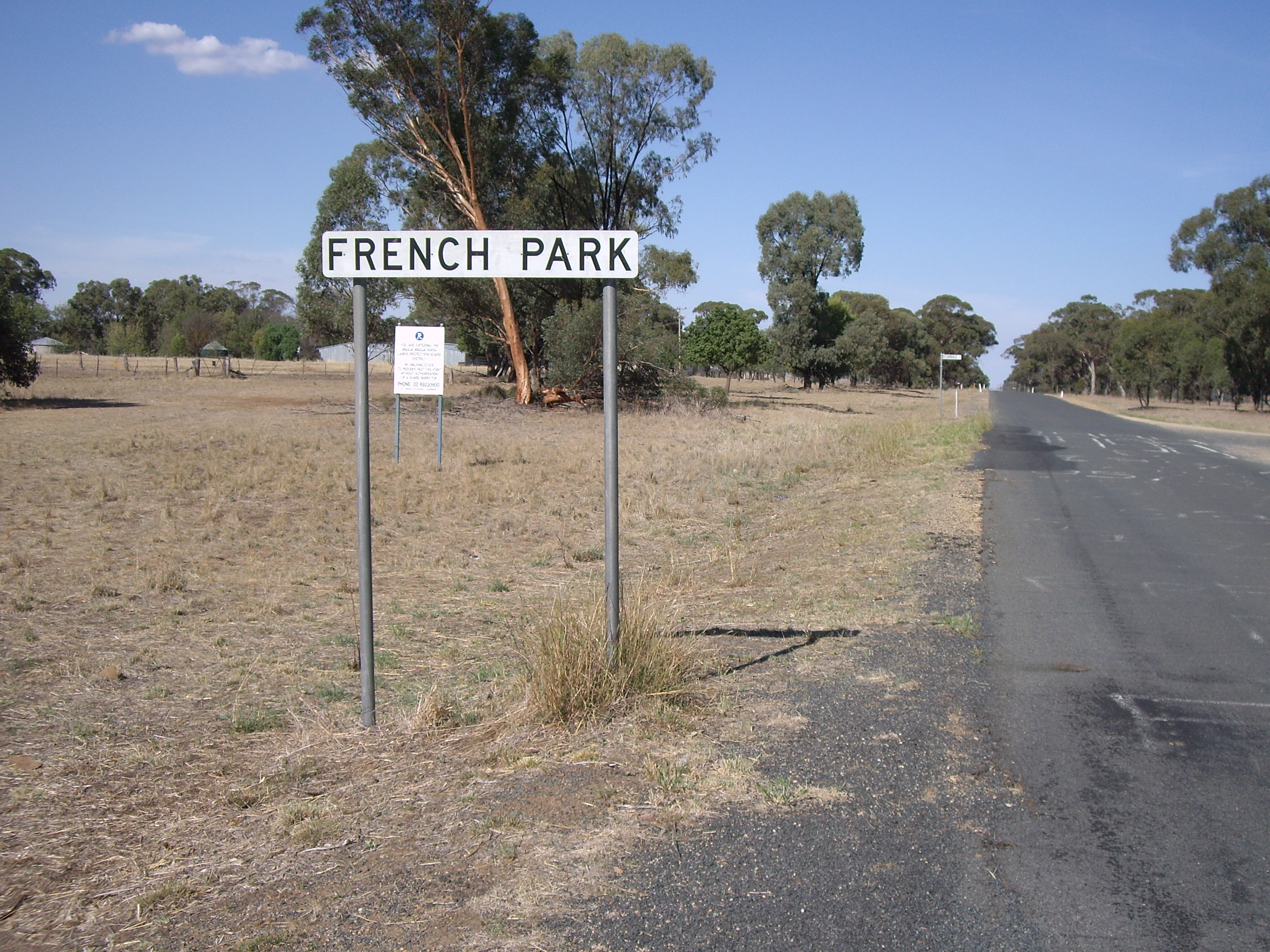
- Entering French Park

- Coordinates: 35°16′S 146°56′E
- Population: 17 (SAL 2021)
- Postcode(s): 2655
- Elevation: 128 m (420 ft)
- Location: 8 km (5 mi) from Milbrulong; 15 km (9 mi) from Tootool
- LGA(s): Lockhart Shire
- County: Mitchell
- State electorate(s): Wagga Wagga

French Park is a rural village community in the central east part of the Riverina. It is situated by road, about 8 kilometres east of Milbrulong and 15 kilometres west of Tootool.

French Park Post Office opened on 16 August 1884 and closed in 1966.

== French Park railway station ==
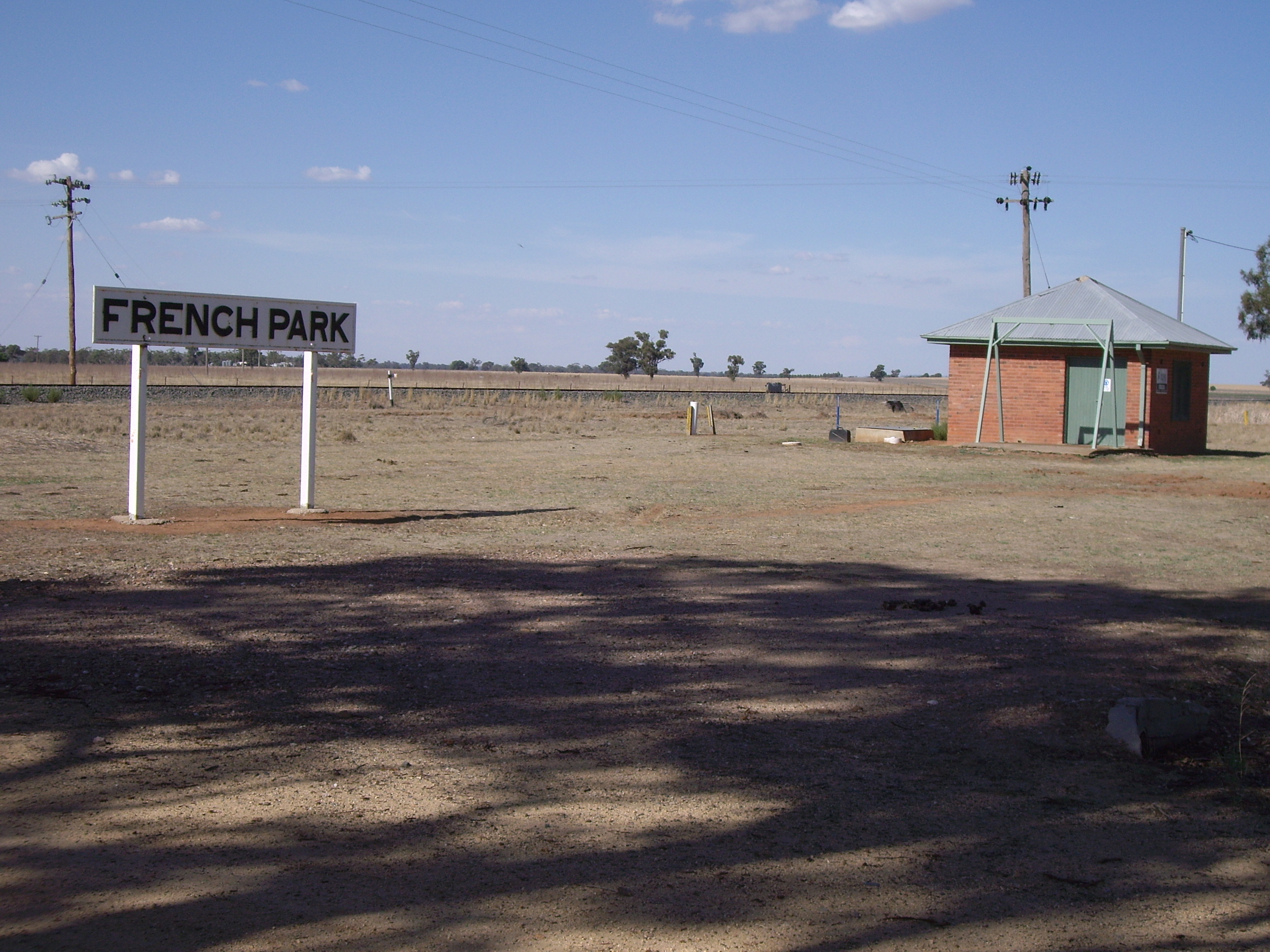
French Park - site of old railway siding

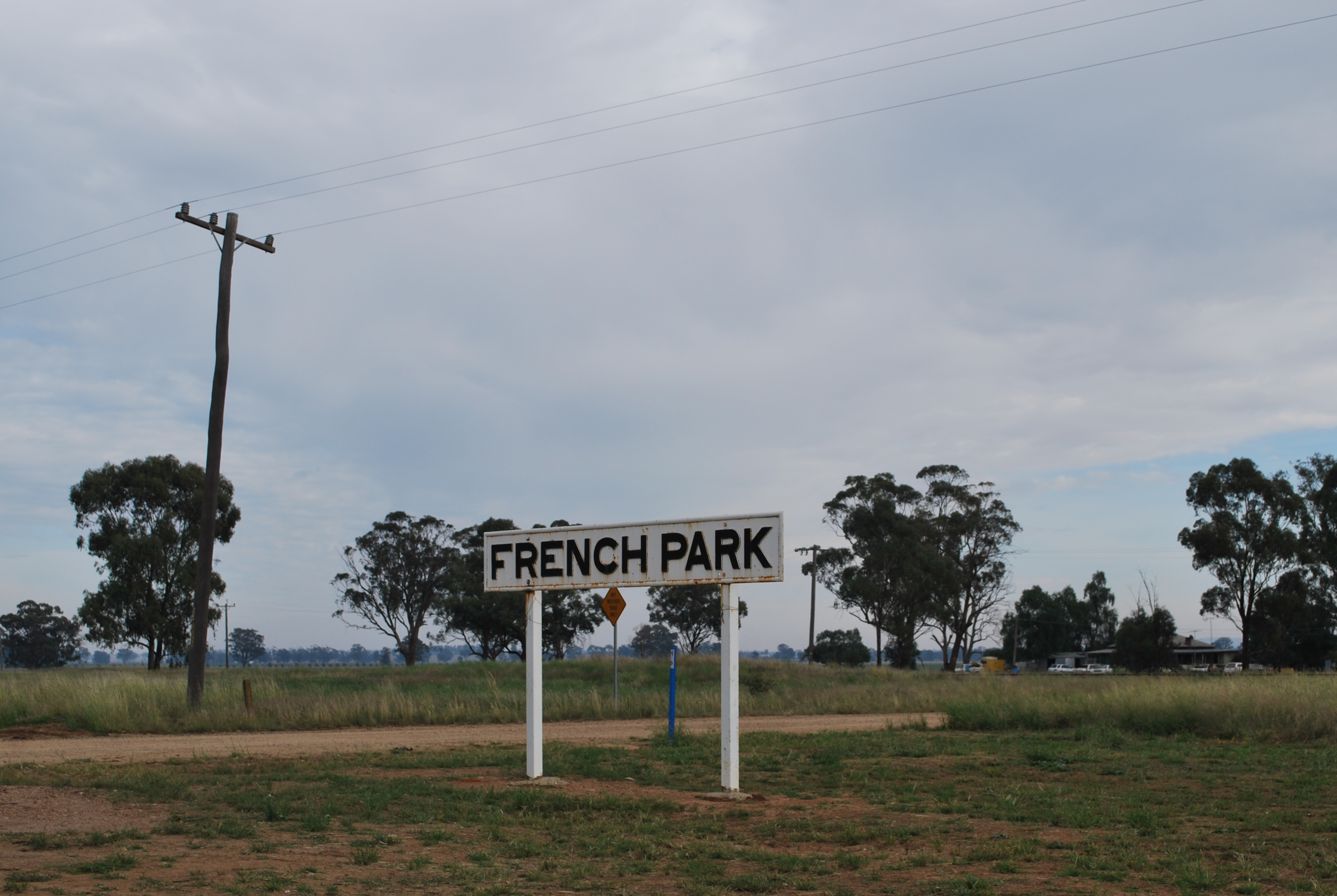
French Park Railway Station Sign

Preceding station	Former services	Following station
Milbrulong towards Oaklands	Oaklands Line	Tootool towards The Rock
