= Riverina Water County Council =

Australian local government body responsible for drinking water

Coordinates: 35.121611°S 147.388136°E

Agency overview
- Formed: 2 May 1997
- Headquarters: Wagga Wagga, New South Wales, Australia
- Employees: 92
- Annual budget: $20 M
- Agency executives: Greg Verdon Lockhart Shire Council, Chairperson; Yvonne Braid Wagga Wagga City Council, Councillor; Paul Funnell Wagga Wagga City Council, Councillor; Vanessa Keenan Wagga Wagga City Council, Councillor; Tim Koschel Wagga Wagga City Council, Councillor; Ian Kreutzberger Federation Council, Representative; Doug Meyer Greater Hume Shire Council, Councillor; Tony Quinn Greater Hume Shire Council, Councillor; Mayor Greg Conkey Wagga Wagga City Council, Councillor
- Website: www.rwcc.nsw.gov.au

Riverina Water County Council is a county council that provides drinking water to the City of Wagga Wagga, Greater Hume Shire, Lockhart Shire and part of Federation Council which operates under the provisions of the Local Government Act, 1993.

== History ==
Southern Riverina County Council was formed in 1938 to supply reticulated water to towns in the Shires of Lockhart, Kyeamba, Mitchell and Culcairn with the Shires of Urana and Holbrook and the Municipality of Wagga Wagga became part of Southern Riverina County Council in 1945.

1942 to 1995 Southern Riverina County Council was responsible for electricity distribution in the Southern Riverina Area until Great Southern Energy was formed in 1995.
