= Chinese Crossing, Yerong Creek =

Chinese Crossing New South Wales
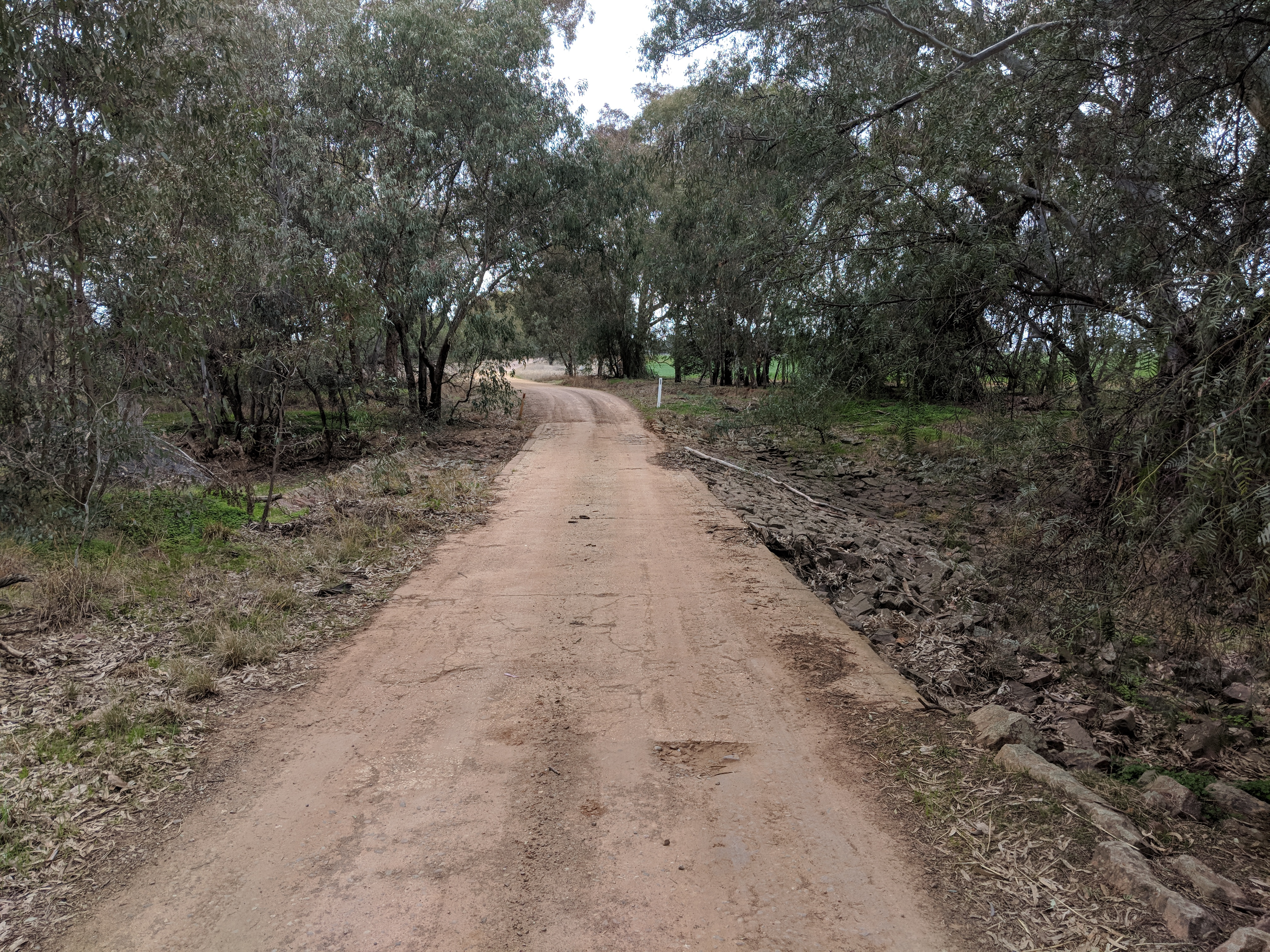
- Chinese Crossing, near Yerong Creek, looking south.

- Coordinates: 35°22′14″S 147°02′01.5″E
- Postcode(s): 2642
- Location: 4.9 km (3 mi) from Yerong Creek; 46.8 km (29 mi) from Lockhart
- LGA(s): Lockhart Shire
- County: Mitchell
- Parish: Vincent
- State electorate(s): Wagga Wagga
- Federal division(s): Riverina

Chinese Crossing, on Noskes Lane, near Yerong Creek, New South Wales, is a stone dam and causeway built in the 1880s by Chinese migrants. It was heritage listed by the Lockhart Shire Council in September 1995.
