= Milbrulong =

- Town
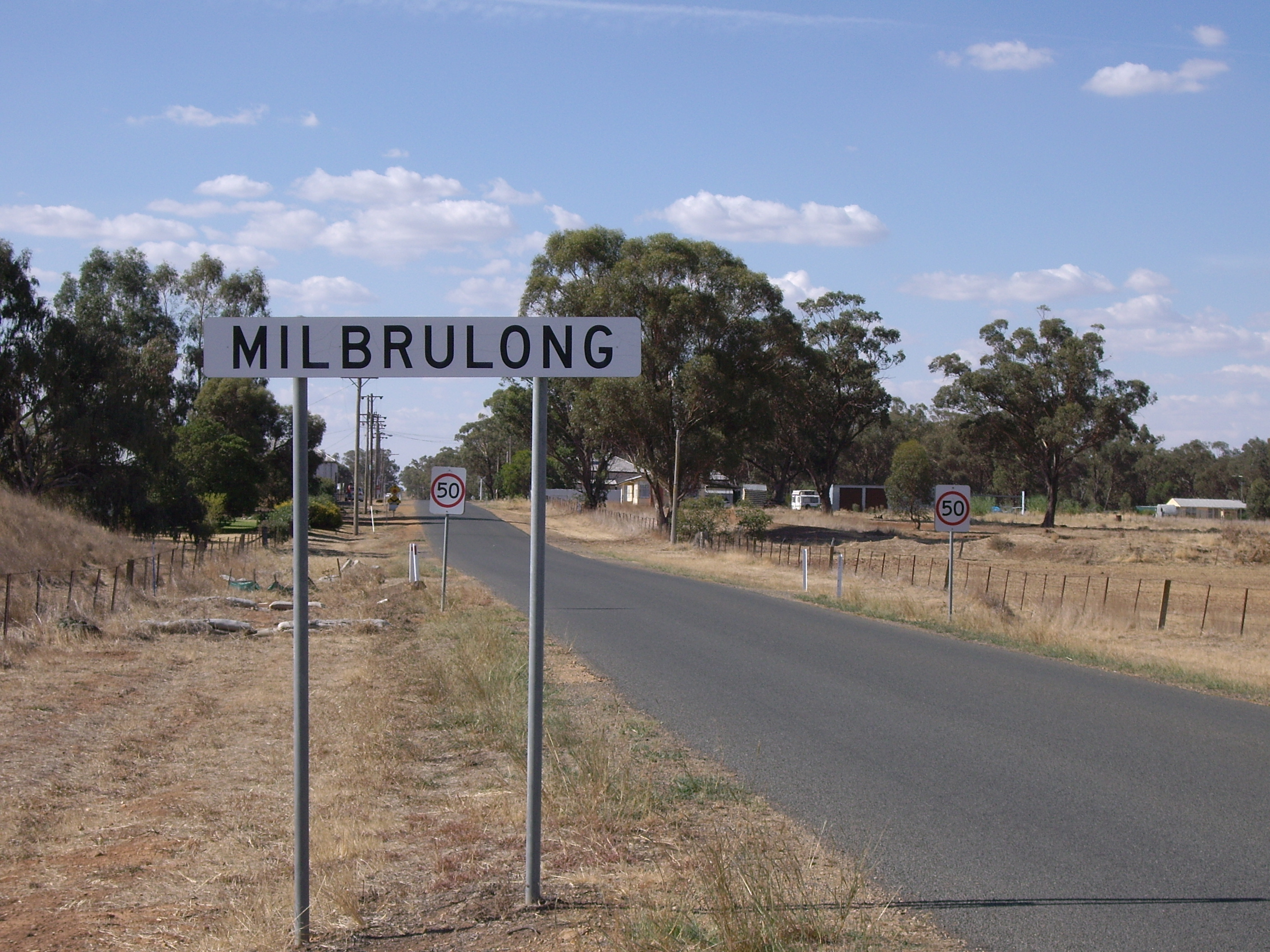
- Entering Milbrulong

- Coordinates: 35°15′0″S 146°52′0″E
- Country: Australia
- State: New South Wales
- LGA: Lockhart Shire
- Location: 515 km (320 mi) SW of Sydney; 59 km (37 mi) SW of Wagga Wagga; 14 km (8.7 mi) E of Lockhart

Government
  - State electorate: Wagga Wagga
  - Federal division: Riverina
- Elevation: 123 m (404 ft)

Population
  - Total: 119 (SAL 2021)
- Postcode: 2656
- County: Urana

Milbrulong is a locality in the central east part of the Riverina region of New South Wales, Australia.

The locality is 515 kilometres (320 mi) south west of the state capital, Sydney and 59 kilometres (37 mi) south west of the regional centre Wagga Wagga in the Lockhart Shire local government area. The standard gauge Oaklands railway line passes through the locality. The Milbrulong State Forest is located nearby.

At the 2006 census, Milbrulong had a population of 366.

== History ==
The place name Milbrulong is derived from the local Wiradjuri word mulbirrang meaning "rosella parrot".

Milbrulong Post Office opened on 7 August 1899 and closed in 1976.

In May, 1900 Mr .J. H. Menz opened his new hotel at Milbrulong and opposite the proposed site of Milbrulong railway station.

The Milbrulong Railway Station was opened in late 1900.

In November 1916, Mrs Menz sold the Boundary Inn Hotel, Milbrulong to Mr R McLean of Adelong.

== Milbrulong Football Club ==
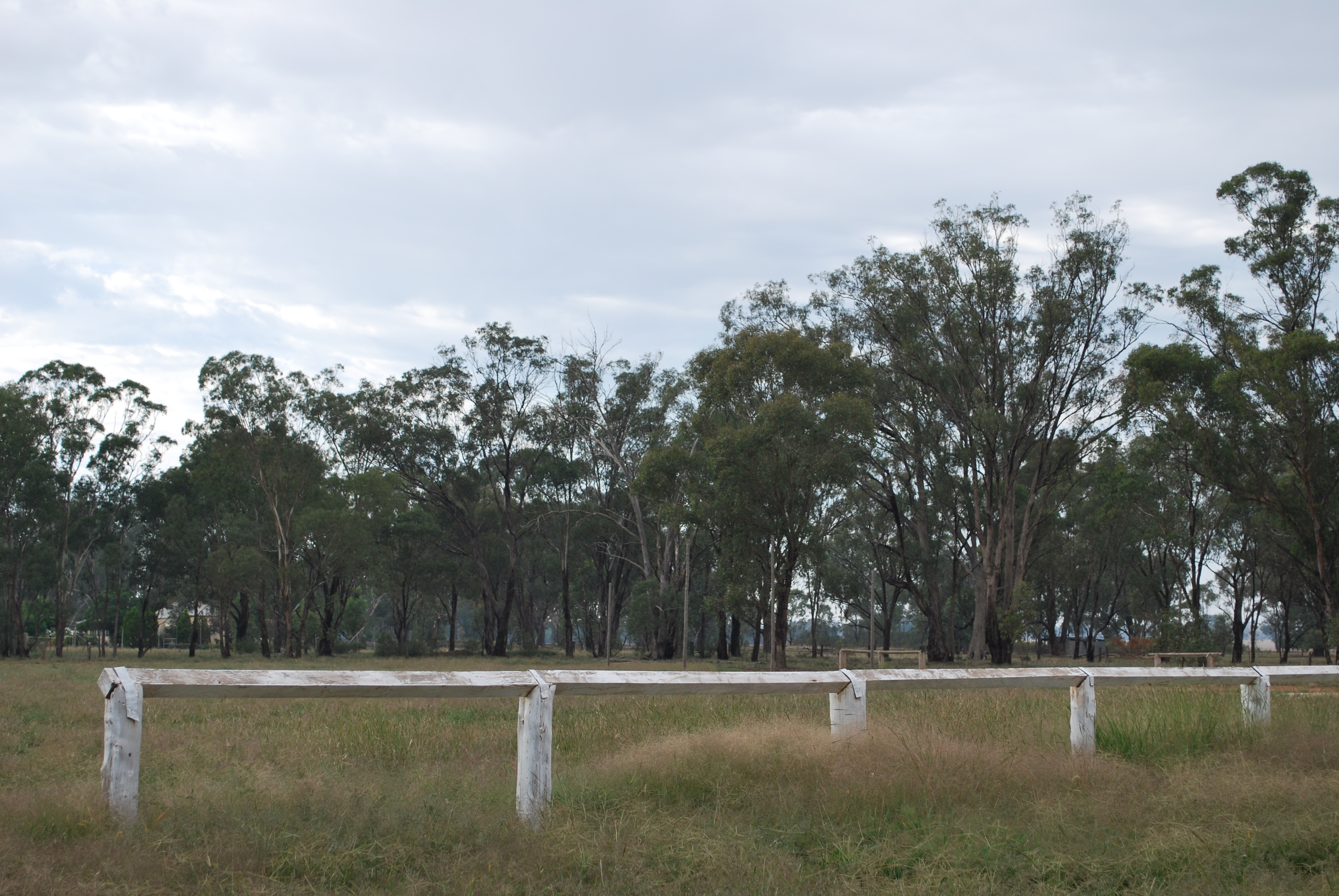
Milbrulong Football Ground

The first published match of the Milbrulong FC was against Lockhart in 1901 and they played in the McLauren Football Competition. The club's colours in 1925 were royal blue. In 1954 the club was known as the Maroons. The club played in the following competitions –

- 1901 – McLaurin Football Competition. Gordon McLaurin was the NSW Member for Hume from 1901 to 1904.
- 1902 – 1903: Club active, playing friendly matches against local clubs, but no evidence of playing in an official competition.
- 1904 – Wagga United Football Association.
- 1906 – Greengunyah Football Association. Premiers: Boree Creek FC
- 1907 – Club active, playing friendly matches against local clubs, but no evidence of playing in an official competition.
- 1908 – Lockhart Football Association.
- 1909 – Lockhart & Boree Creek Football Association.
- 1910 – 1911: The Rock Football Association. Premiers: 1910 Finished on top of the ladder., 1911
- 1912 – Lockhart Football Association. Premiers: Boree Creek FC
- 1913 – Lockhart Football Association. Merged with Tootool FC under the name of Milbrulong FC. Premiers: Oaklands FC.
- 1914 – 1915: Milbrulong Football Association: Premiers 1914
- 1916 & 1917: Club in recess due to WW1.
- 1918: Lockhart Football Association: Club reformed. In 1918, club captain, William T. McCarthy died in a truck accident. Runners Up: 1918
- 1919 – 1920: Milbrulong Football Association: In 1919 won by Tootool FC. In 1920 won by Brookdale FC.
- 1921 – Lockhart & District Football Association:
- 1922 – Borree Creek Football Association: Runners Up – 1922
- 1923 – 1924: Lockhart Oaklands Line Football Association: Oaklands FC were undefeated premiers in 1923 and won in 1924.
- 1925 – Urangeline Football Association: Milbrulong FC played off in the "final", then Lockhart and Milbrulong were both expelled for not playing the grand final on a neutral ground.
- 1926 – 1927: The Rock Football Association: Premiers: Mangoplah FC in 1926 & 1927.
- 1928 – Possibly in recess.
- 1929 – Lockhart & District Lines Football Association:
- 1930 – 1931: The Rock & District Football Association: Milbrulong FC and Tootool FC merged to become Tootool United FC and won the 1930 premiership.
- 1932 – Tootool United FC disbanded prior to the 1932 football season.
- 1933 – 1939: The Rock & District Football Association. Milbrulong FC reforms in 1933. Premiers: 1939 Runners Up: 1935, 1938 – 1st Grand final drawn, then lost the replay.
- 1940 – Lockhart & District Football League. Won by Osborne FC.
- 1941 – 1944: Club in recess due to WW2.
- 1945 – 1948: Milbrulong & District Football League. Premiers: 1945 – The Rock FC, 1946 – Milbrulong FC, 1947 – The Rock FC, 1948 – Lockhart FC
- 1949 – 1958: Central Riverina Football League – The Milbrulong & DFL changed its name at their 1949 AGM. Premiers: 1949 – Lockhart FC, 1950 – Osborne FC, 1951 – Collingullie, 1952 – Collingullie, 1953 – Boree Creek FC, 1954 – Yerong Creek FC d Milbrulong

== Gallery ==
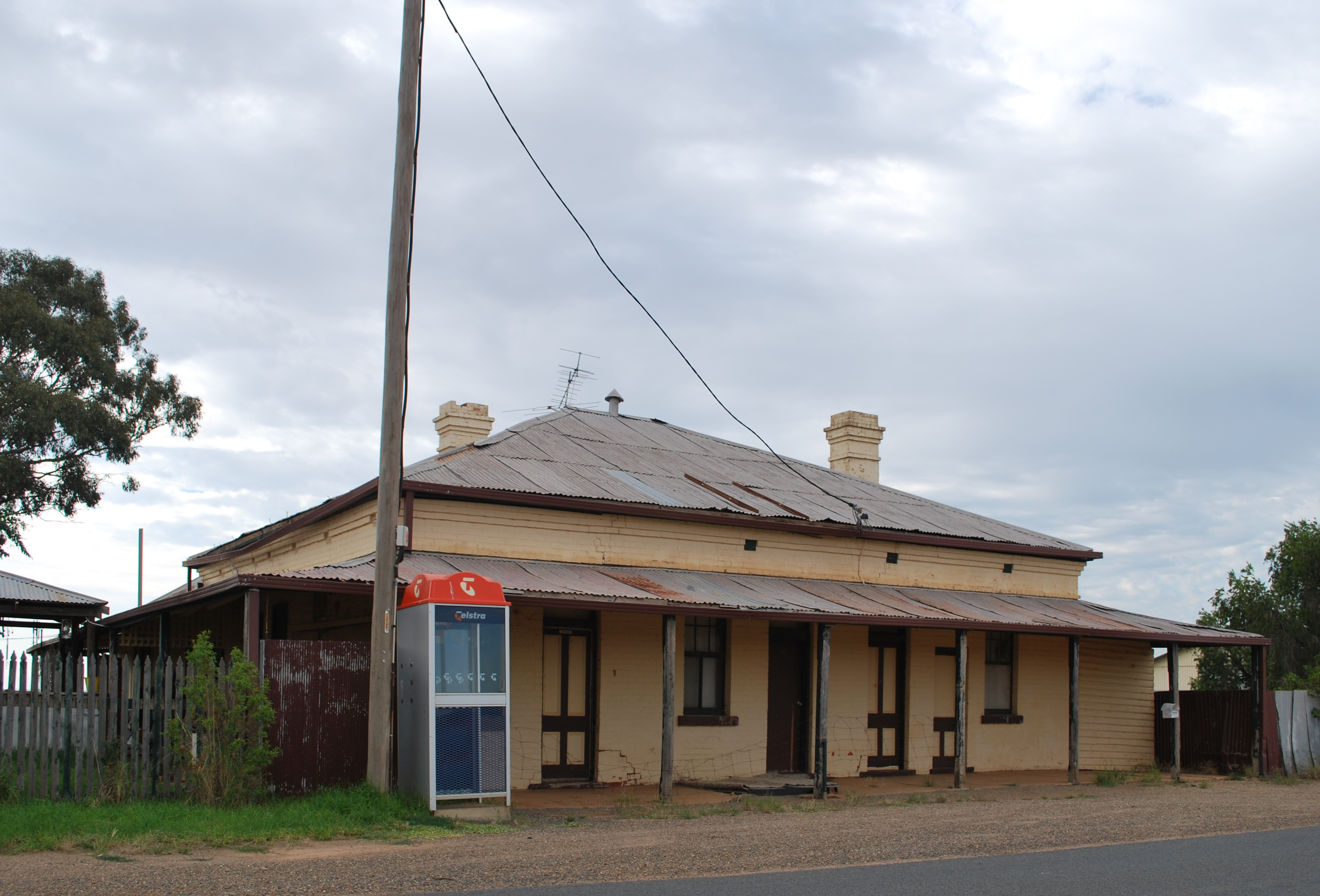
The former Boundary Inn Hotel

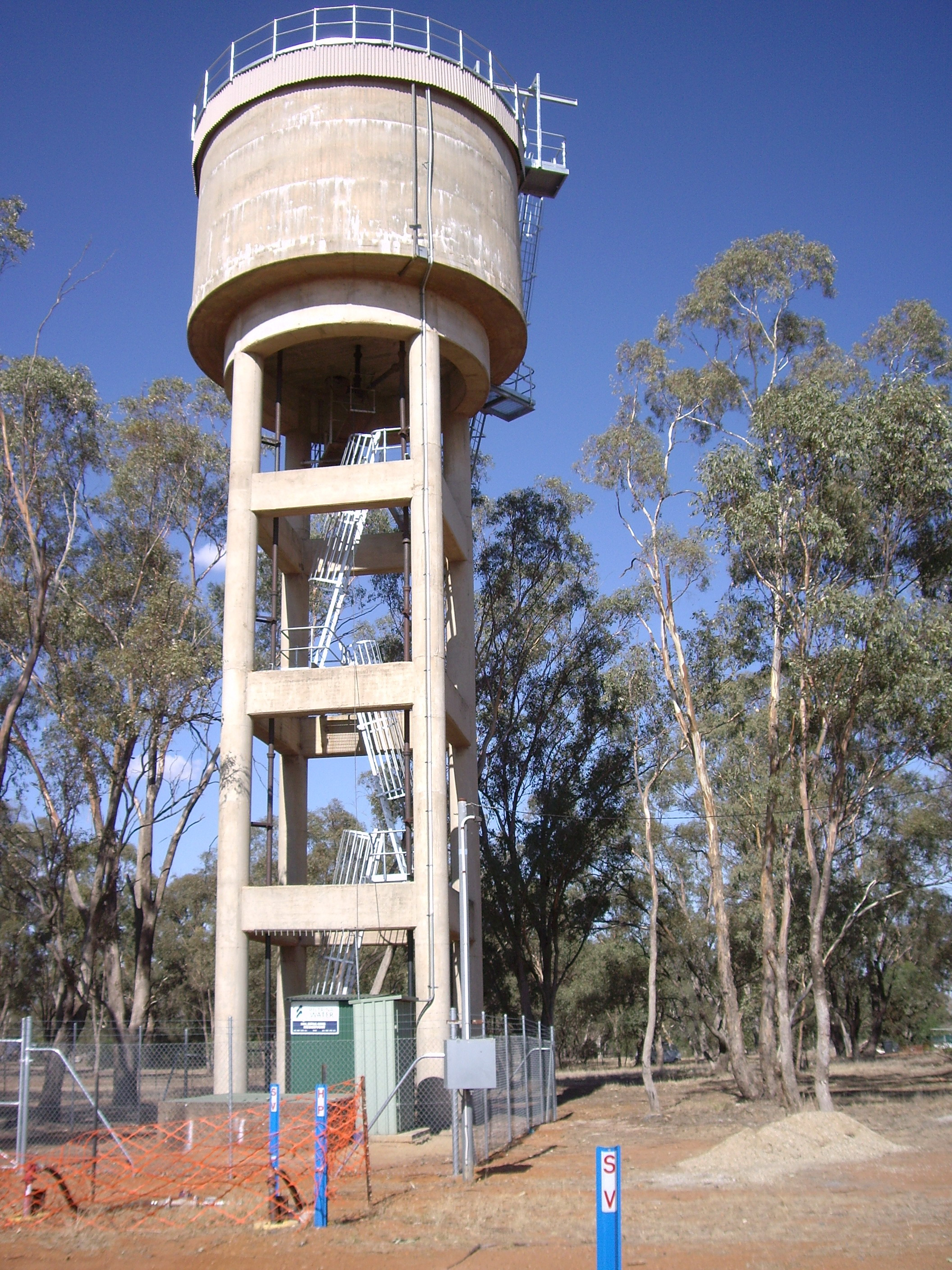
Milbrulong water tank

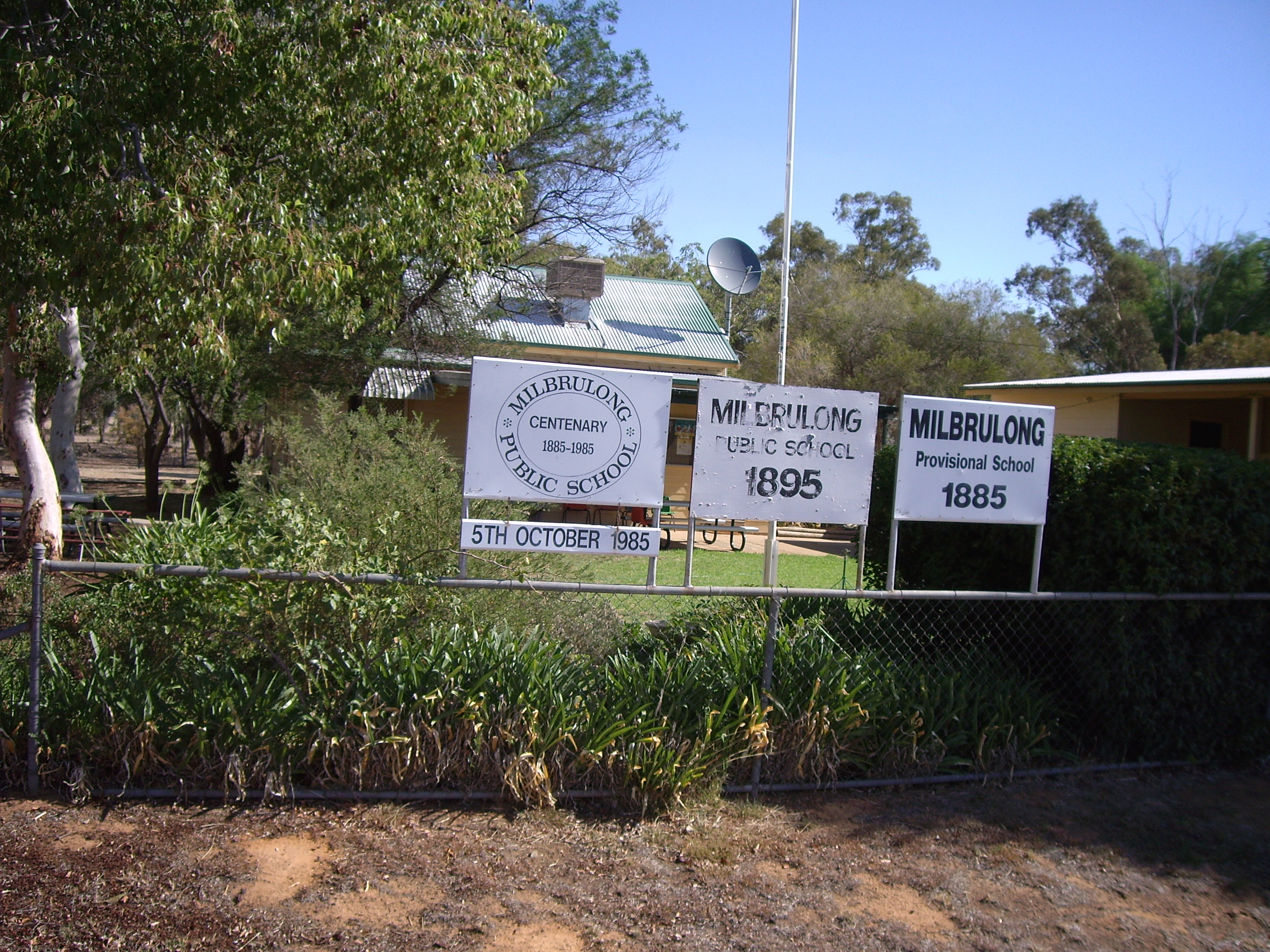
Milbrulong Public School

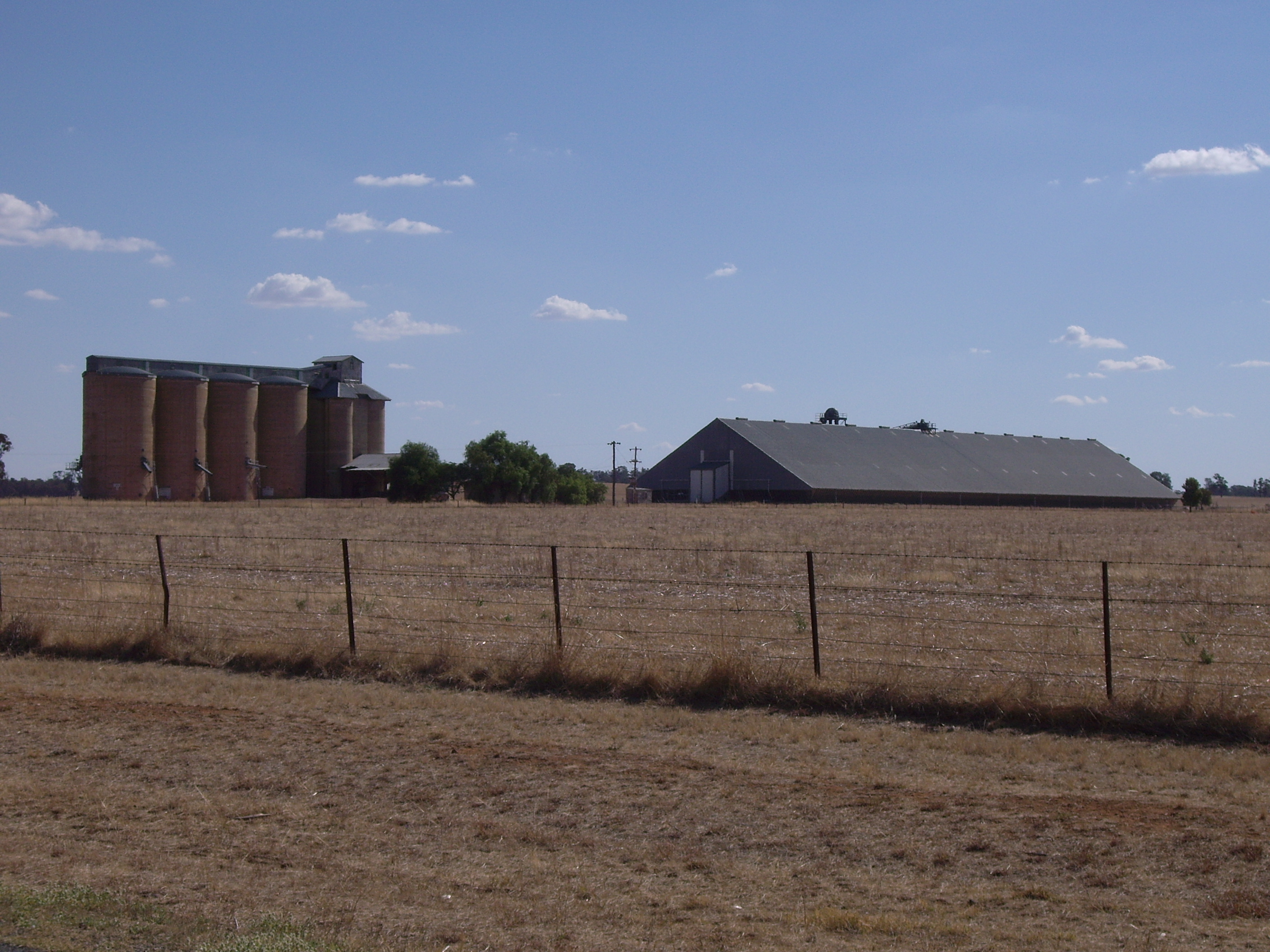
Silos at Milbrulong

Preceding station	Former services	Following station
Napier towards Oaklands	Oaklands Line	French Park towards The Rock
