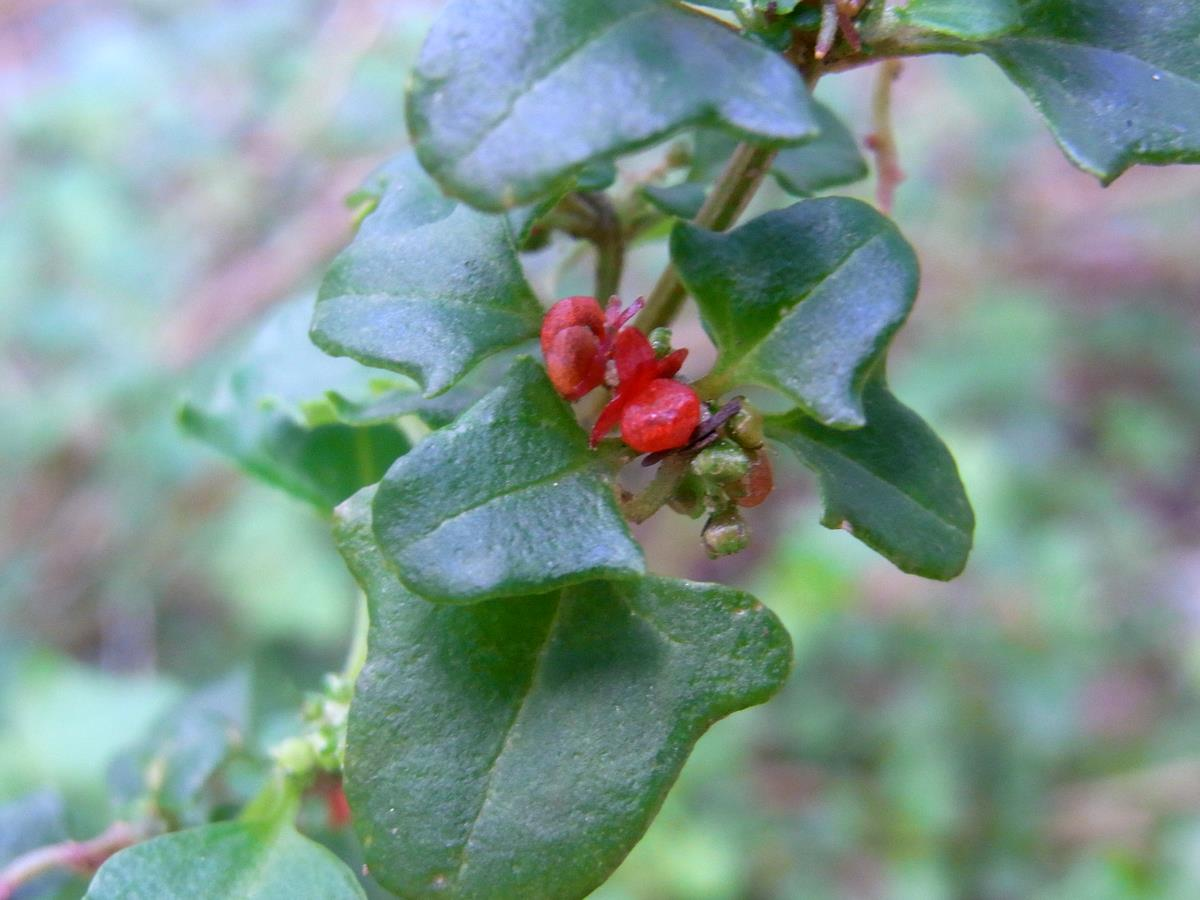
- Eastwood, Australia

Scientific classification
- Kingdom: Plantae
- Clade: Tracheophytes
- Clade: Angiosperms
- Clade: Eudicots
- Order: Caryophyllales
- Family: Amaranthaceae
- Genus: Chenopodium
- Species: C. robertianum

Binomial name
- Chenopodium robertianum Iamonico & Mosyakin

Synonyms
- Rhagodia hastata R.Br.; Einadia hastata (R. Br.) A.J. Scott

= Chenopodium robertianum =

Species of flowering plant

Chenopodium robertianum (Syn. Einadia hastata, Rhagodia hastata), known by the common name of saloop or berry saltbush is a small plant in the family Amaranthaceae. This species is found in coastal and inland areas of eastern Australia. Occasionally seen in rainforest gullies, though mostly seen in more open areas.

Often found in the heavier soils, up to 50 cm tall. Leaves may be opposite or alternate on the stem. Triangular to broadly triangular in shape. Tiny green flowers form in summer.

== Taxonomy ==
The original specimen was collected at Sydney in the early colonial days. This species first appeared in the scientific literature as Rhagodia hastata in 1810 in the Prodromus Florae Novae Hollandiae, authored by the prolific Scottish botanist, Robert Brown. In 1978, Andrew John Scott made the combination Einadia hastata. After phylogenetical research, Fuentes-Bazan et al. (2012) included this species in genus Chenopodium, as Chenopodium hastatum (R.Br.) S. Fuentes & Borsch., but this name was a later homonym and thus illegitimate. In 2017, Iamonico & Mosyakin replaced it by the name Chenopodium robertianum, honouring the botanist Robert Brown.
