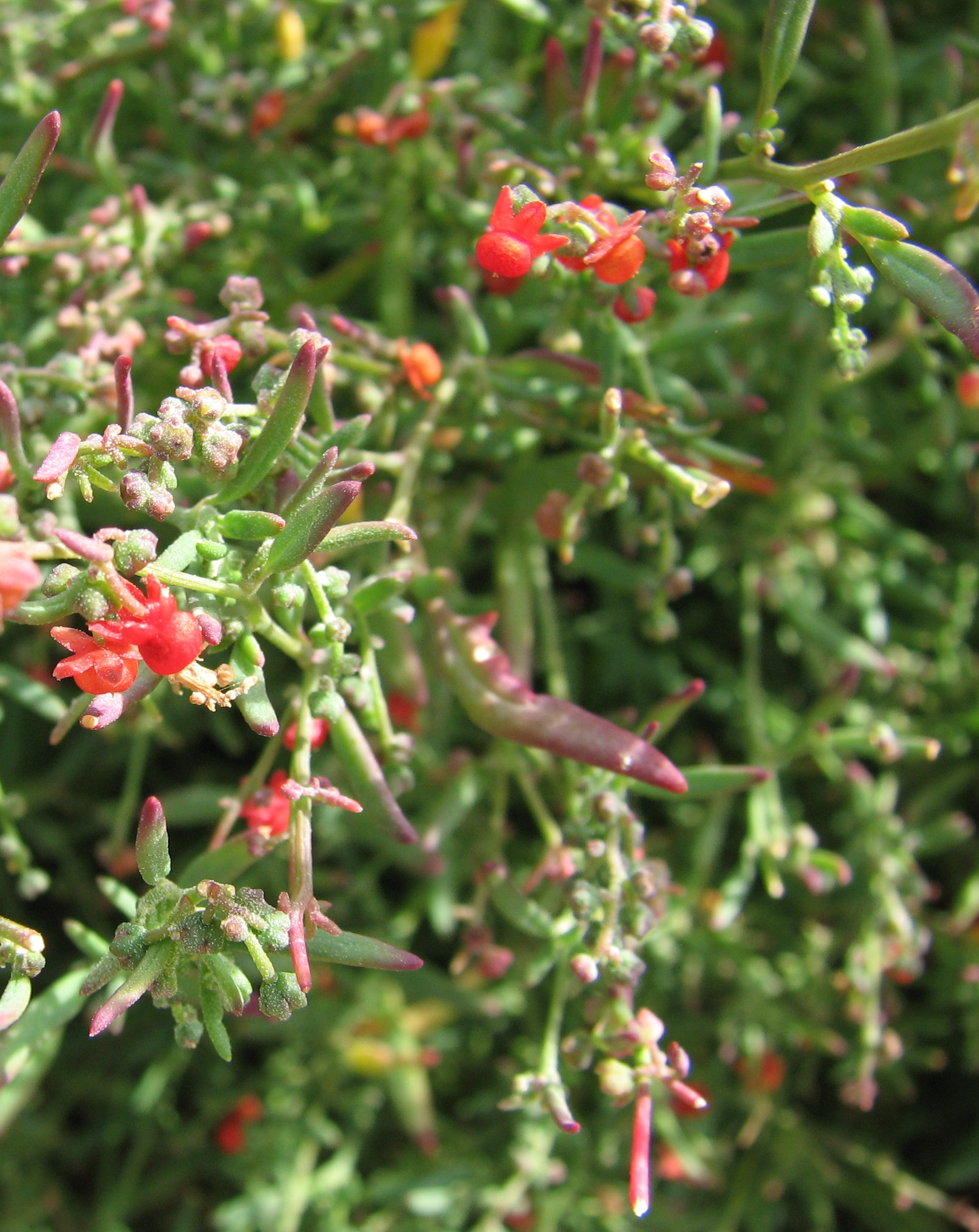

Scientific classification
- Kingdom: Plantae
- Clade: Tracheophytes
- Clade: Angiosperms
- Clade: Eudicots
- Order: Caryophyllales
- Family: Amaranthaceae
- Genus: Chenopodium
- Species: C. nutans

Binomial name
- Chenopodium nutans (R.Br.) S.Fuentes & Borsch

Synonyms
- Einadia nutans (R.Br.) A. J. Scott; Rhagodia nutans R.Br.

= Chenopodium nutans =

Species of flowering plant

Chenopodium nutans (Syn Einadia nutans, Rhagodia nutans), known by its common name of climbing saltbush or nodding saltbush, is a climbing groundcover native to Australia.

Plants form a blanket on the surface, climbing over logs and up trees to a height of around 1 metre. Each plant grows to around one metre in diameter. The small leaves are semi-succulent, and have a distinctive arrowhead shape. They grow along long, vine-like branches spreading out form the centre of the plant. Both the leaves and the branches are of a light green colour.

Flowers are inconspicuous green balls, which form on top of terminal spikes during summer. These transform into very conspicuous, tiny, bright-red berries during early autumn.

== Human uses ==
The plant was boiled along with other species of saltbush for use as a greens substitute by early European settlers in the Adelaide region. The plant is easily propagated, making it a particularly attractive and useful plant for revegetation projects. It has recently been enjoying increasing popularity as a garden plant, for its low maintenance, low water usage properties.
