= Lockhart Shire =

- Local government area
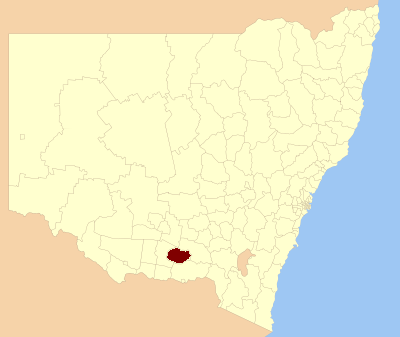
- Location in New South Wales

- Interactive map of Lockhart Shire
- Coordinates: 35°13′S 146°43′E
- Country: Australia
- State: New South Wales
- Region: Riverina
- Established: 1906
- Council seat: Lockhart

Government
  - Mayor: Cr Peter Sharp
  - State electorate: Wagga Wagga

Area
  - Total: 2,895.32 km^{2} (1,117.89 sq mi)

Population
  - Totals: 3,119 (2016); 3,295 (2018 est.)
  - Density: 1.07726/km^{2} (2.7901/sq mi)
- Website: Lockhart Shire
LGAs around Lockhart Shire
Narrandera	Wagga Wagga	Wagga Wagga
Federation	Lockhart Shire	Wagga Wagga
Federation	Greater Hume	Greater Hume

Lockhart Shire is a local government area in the Riverina region of New South Wales, Australia. The Shire was created in 1906 and is an agricultural and pastoral area.

The main towns and villages in the Shire include Lockhart (950 people), The Rock (860), Yerong Creek (145), Pleasant Hills (130) and Milbrulong (35). It has 1302 rural residents.

Galore Hill Scenic Reserve is located approximately 12 kilometres (7.5 mi) north of Lockhart.

== Demographics ==
Selected historical census data for Lockhart Shire local government area
Census year		2001	2006	2011	2016	2021
Population	Estimated residents on census night	3,391	▼3,180	▼2,998	▲3,119	▲3,319
Population	LGA rank in terms of size within New South Wales			121st	▲119th	119th
Population	% of New South Wales population	0.05%	0.05%	▼0.04%	0.04%	0.04%
Population	% of Australian population	0.02%	0.02%	▼0.01%	0.01%	0.01%
Cultural and language diversity						
Ancestry, top responses	Australian			34.6%	▼33.5%	▲42.0%
Ancestry, top responses	English			29.6%	▼27.6%	▲38.8%
Ancestry, top responses	Irish			10.4%	▲10.5%	▲15.3%
Ancestry, top responses	Scottish			9.2%	▼8.4%	▲13.0%
Ancestry, top responses	German			7.1%	▼6.1%	▲9.2%
Language, top responses (other than English)	Cantonese	0.1%	▲0.2%	▼ n/c	▲0.3%	0.3%
Language, top responses (other than English)	Dutch	n/c	▲0.1%	▼ n/c	n/c	▲0.2%
Language, top responses (other than English)	Nepali	n/c	n/c	n/c	n/c	▲0.2%
Language, top responses (other than English)	Japanese	n/c	n/c	n/c	▲0.1%	▲0.2%
Language, top responses (other than English)	Spanish	n/c	▲0.2%	▼ n/c	n/c	▲0.2%
Religious affiliation						
Religious affiliation, top responses	Catholic	26.6%	▲29.9%	▲30.4%	▼29.3%	▼28.4%
Religious affiliation, top responses	No Religion, so described	n/c	▲7.3%	▲9.5%	▲17.3%	▲24.8%
Religious affiliation, top responses	Anglican	22.9%	▼22.0%	▼20.6%	▼16.8%	▼14.3%
Religious affiliation, top responses	Not stated	n/c	n/c	n/c	▲11.2%	▼9.2%
Religious affiliation, top responses	Uniting Church	15.3%	▼14.7%	▼12.2%	▼10.2%	▼7.9%
Median weekly incomes						
Personal income	Median weekly personal income		A$393	A$456	A$585	A$639
Personal income	% of Australian median income		84.3%	▼79.0%	▲88.4%	▼79.4%
Family income	Median weekly family income		A$1,034	A$1,069	A$1,408	A$1,636
Family income	% of Australian median income		88.3%	▼72.2%	▲81.2%	▼77.2%
Household income	Median weekly household income		A$777	A$868	A$1,114	A$1,295
Household income	% of Australian median income		75.7%	▼70.3%	▲77.5%	▼74.2%

== Proposed amalgamation ==
A 2015 review of local government boundaries by the NSW Government Independent Pricing and Regulatory Tribunal recommended that the Lockhart Shire merge with the Corowa and Urana shires to form a new council with an area of 8,581 square kilometres (3,313 sq mi) and support a population of approximately 16,000. In May 2016 the Minister for Local Government announced that following an independent review of merger proposals, the Government decided that the Corowa and Urana shire councils merge to form the Federation Council; while the Lockhart Shire would not amalgamate.

== Heritage listings ==
Lockhart Shire has a number of heritage-listed sites, including:

- Chinese Crossing
- The Rock railway station

== Council ==
=== Current composition and election method ===
Lockhart Shire Council is composed of nine councillors elected proportionally as three separate wards, each electing three councillors.

== Election results ==
=== 2024 ===
2024 New South Wales local elections: Lockhart
Party	Votes	%	Swing	Seats	Change
Independents	1,271	100	Steady	9	Steady
Formal votes	1,271	94.8			
Informal votes	70	5.2			
Total	1,341	100			
Registered voters / turnout	2,372	(Note: As A Ward did not hold elections, about one third of voters did not vote. Overall turnout among the other two wards was 83.3%)56.5			

=== 2016 ===
2021 New South Wales local elections: Carrathool
Party	Votes	%	Swing	Seats	Change
Independents	1,181	100.0		9	Steady
Formal votes					
Informal votes					
Total					
Registered voters / turnout					

== See also ==
- Riverina Water County Council
