= Walla Walla, New South Wales =

Walla Walla
- Town
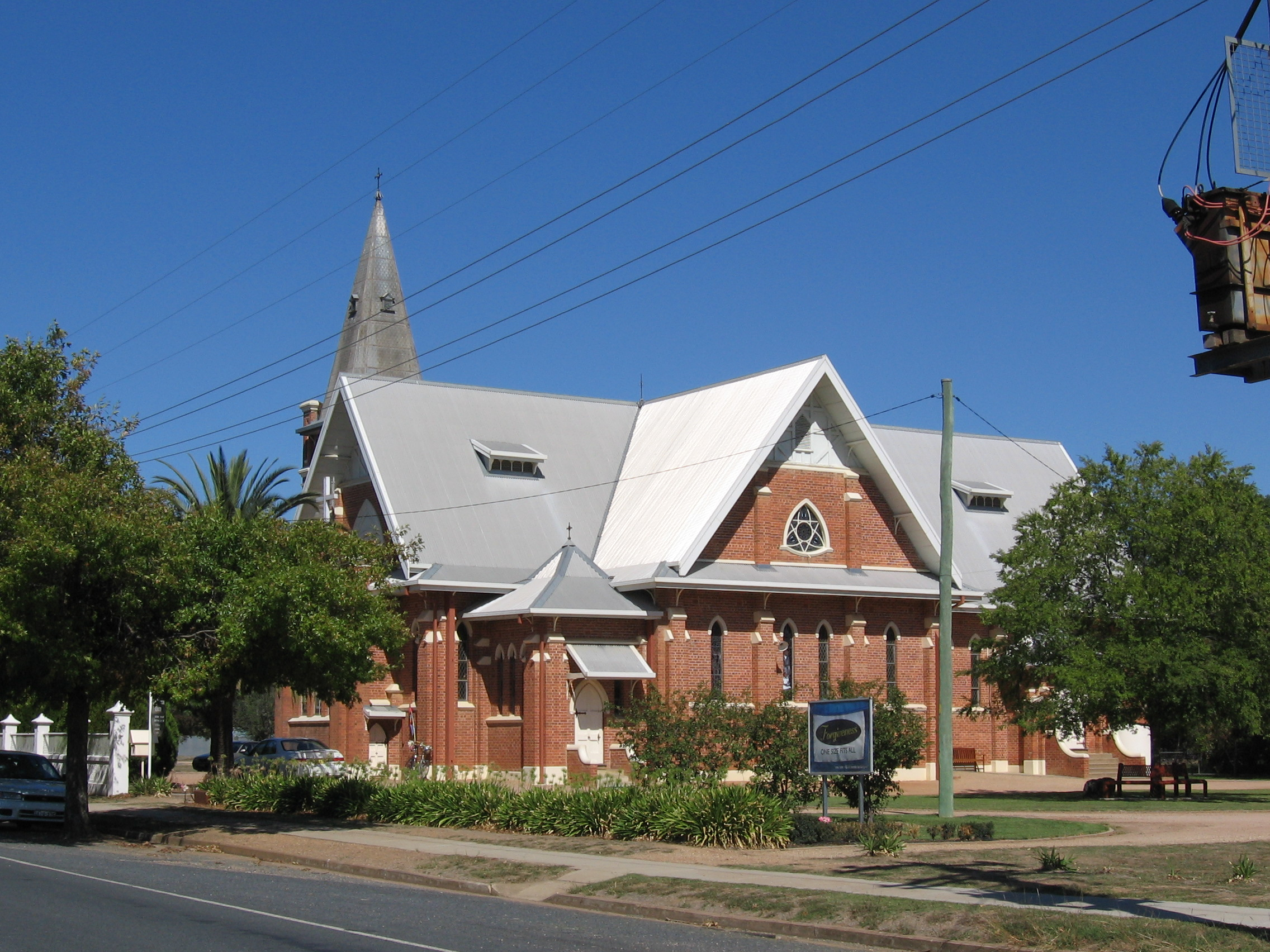
- Zion Lutheran Church

- Coordinates: 35°45′0″S 146°54′0″E
- Country: Australia
- State: New South Wales
- LGA: Greater Hume
- Location: 540 km (340 mi) from Sydney; 348 km (216 mi) from Melbourne; 39 km (24 mi) from Albury; 26 km (16 mi) from Culcairn
- Established: 1869

Government
  - State electorate: Albury
  - Federal division: Farrer
- Elevation: 196 m (643 ft)

Population
  - Total: 836 (2016 census)
- Postcode: 2659
- County: Hume
- Parish: Walla Walla
Localities around Walla Walla
Walbundrie	Alma Park	Culcairn
	Walla Walla
Burrumbuttock	Jindera	Gerogery

Walla Walla or Wallawalla (English: /ˈwɒlə ˈwɒlə/) is a town in the Riverina region of southern New South Wales, Australia and is serviced by the Greater Hume Shire Council. It is about 39 kilometres (24 mi) north of Albury-Wodonga and 130 kilometres (81 mi) south of Wagga Wagga.

Walla Walla had a population of 581 people in 2006 and has the largest Lutheran church in New South Wales.

Walla Walla has an elevation of 196 metres (643 ft) above sea level. In summer Walla Walla has an average high of 31 °C (88 °F) and a low of 13 °C (55 °F), and during winter it has a high of 12 °C (54 °F) and a low of 2 °C (36 °F), although maximum temperatures can reach the mid-40s °C (mid-110s °F) and the area often experiences frosts during winter.

Until 2016 it was the home of the Walla Walla Football Club which played as a stand-alone team in the Hume Football League until having to merge with Rand & Walbundrie due to lack of players. Walla Walla has many other sports available such as tennis, lawn bowls, croquet, cricket and a local swimming pool.

Walla Walla is also the home of St Paul's College, the only Lutheran secondary school in NSW. The school offers an equine program, with many students keeping horses in the adjacent equine centre, as well as agricultural studies. Boarding students are drawn from communities within the Greater Hume Shire, the Riverina, North Eastern Victoria and further afield from the cities of Sydney, Canberra and Melbourne.

== History ==
The Walla Walla area was home to the Wiradjuri Aboriginal people who inhabited this area for many thousands of years prior to European settlement.

The explorers Hume and Hovell passed through the area in late 1824 noting its potential for grazing livestock. Squatters first arrived in 1834 and four stations, including "Round Hill" and "Walla Walla" were established by 1845. During the 1860s the bushranger Dan "Mad Dog" Morgan frequented the area holding up the Round Hill Station at nearby Morven. He also established a lookout at a granite outcrop 6 km north of Walla Walla adjacent to the Walla Walla Station and Billabong Creek.

Walla Walla was established in 1869 when 56 settlers of German extraction moved from their home in the Barossa Valley of South Australia in the search for farming land. At that time South Australian farmland was in short supply and the New South Wales government was releasing tracts of fertile land at relatively cheap prices. In all, 56 people made the trek in 14 covered wagons and 2 spring carts, leaving their hometown of Ebenezer in October 1868. This group was led by Father Klemke and it comprised the families of Michael Wenke, Andreas Mickan and Andreas Lieschke; as well as two Klemke families, the Fischer, Terlich and Hennersdorf families and two single men in Ferdinand Schmidt and Wilhelm Luhrs. Ethnically, most of these families belonged to a minority group known as Wends or Sorbs and some had only recently emigrated from the North Eastern German States. Although these settlers first named the township Ebenezer after their hometown in South Australia, its name was changed to Walla Walla (Wiradjuri for "place of many rocks") because another township with the same name existed in New South Wales. This was neither the first nor the last trek by German South Australians to the Riverina with other settlements established nearby at Jindera, Bethel, Gerogery, Wallendool (Alma Park), Dudal-Cooma (Pleasant Hills), Mangoplah, Edgehill and Henty.

Walla Walla Post Office opened on 1 February 1878.

The Walla Walla Hotel was opened in the early 20th century by Mr Fredrick Voss, the original publican.

At the turn of the twentieth century, Walla Walla was charactered by its close-knit community which contributed to its preservation of the German language and the old ways. Although the First World War fostered a sense of nationalism (albeit strongly allied to the British Empire) this period was a challenging time for the Walla Walla community due to its ethnicity and the political issues of conscription and disenfranchisement from the electoral roll. According to one view, Walla Walla was reported as 'Berlin' and a 'hotbed of disloyalty'. In all, four local residents, including two Justices of the Peace and members of the Culcairn Shire Council were interned in the Holsworthy Concentration Camp. Tellingly, the honour board at the Walla Walla Soldiers Memorial Hall describes the war as one against 'Prussian Militarism' rather than Germany.

With the outbreak of the Second World War, tensions evident during the First World War did not take long to resurface. This time the attention of the authorities was directed toward the Lutheran pastors in the region, rather than its civic leaders. This was the case because conscription was no longer the issue that it had been in the First World War and some Lutheran pastors had shown pro-German sympathies with the resurgence of Germany. These pastors (including Pastor JTP Stolz from Walla Walla) were questioned and their activities were monitored.

== Schooling ==
The first school at Walla Walla was a congregational school and it was established in 1873. Instruction was conducted in the German language. This school operated from the original Zion Church building until 1883 when a mudbrick schoolhouse was opened. Two years later, in 1885, this school was leased to the NSW Department of Public Instruction and responsibility for educating the local children passed to the State. German-speaking classes continued to be conducted but only for several afternoons a week and then only until the outbreak of the First World War.

In the 1930s the desire of the local community for Christian secondary education led to the establishment of St Paul's College. Mr Werner Hebart, the founding headmaster, was previously a senior master at The Friend's School, Hobart (Tasmania). St Paul's commenced in 1948 with 28 foundation students, including thirteen boarders who resided with local families. St Paul's moved onto its current premises, from its temporary location in Zion church in 1950.

== Local heritage attractions ==
The German heritage of Walla Walla is a feature of the town and it is most obvious with street names such as Scholz Street, Jacob Wenke Circuit, Klemke Avenue and Hermann Street. Less obviously, this cultural aspect of the town is also seen through the Lutheran influence by way of Zion Lutheran Church and St Paul's College. An account of the journey of the original German settlers, together with artefacts of their journey (including some of the original wagons) is on display in the Jindera Pioneer Museum. A replica wagon and a display is also located in the grounds of Zion Lutheran Church and many early headstones in the local cemetery have German inscriptions.

Walla Walla's heritage items were identified by a community survey to include Morgan's Lookout, Zion Lutheran Church and the Walla Walla Swamp (Gum Swamp).

Morgans Lookout
Morgans Lookout is a white granite outcrop located next to Billabong Creek, which is the longest creek in the Southern hemisphere. Due to its elevation, this local geological feature was used by the bushranger Dan "Mad Dog" Morgan as a lookout for police parties. Local folklore tells of Morgan hiding his horses in deep crevices within the rocks when the police came nearby. Morgans Lookout was also used as a lookout for fires in the late 1800s, a concern that was heightened by the fear of arson due to an industrial dispute between graziers and shearers.

Zion Lutheran Church
The original Lutheran church was built from white granite in 1872. The present Zion Lutheran Church was built in 1924 and it is the largest Lutheran Church in New South Wales, with seating for almost 600 people. The church is characterised by its stained glass windows and its massive pipe organ. Nearby, the schoolhouse built in 1883 by the Zion congregation is still extant.

Gum Swamp
Gum Swamp is a nationally important wetland covering 458 hectares. This area is home to Aboriginal heritage sites, local flora and fauna, including at least 128 species of birdlife.

== Notable People from Walla Walla ==
- Appearance activist Carly Findlay grew up in Walla Walla
- Neville Forge, Australian rules footballer
- Lindsay Jacob, Australian rules footballer

== See also ==
- List of reduplicated Australian place names
- Walla Walla (disambiguation)
