= St Paul's College, Walla Walla =

Coordinates: 35.755°S 146.907°E

St Paul’s College

Location
- 3 Klemke Avenue; Walla Walla, New South Wales, 2659; Australia

Information
- Type: Independent, coeducational, secondary, day and boarding
- Motto: Nisi Dominus Frustra; Unless the Lord builds the house, its builders labour in vain – Ps 127:1
- Denomination: Lutheran
- Established: 10 February 1948
- Principal: Anita Morton
- Grades: Years 7–12
- Enrolment: 290
- Colours: Blue and gold
- Website: www.stpaulscollege.nsw.edu.au

St Paul's College is a coeducational day and boarding school providing secondary schooling in Walla Walla, New South Wales, Australia. It is a member school of Lutheran Education Australia, a network of 85 schools and 42 kindergarten/early childhood centres educating approximately 38,000 students Australia wide, and it forms part of the Riverina group of Lutheran schools together with Lutheran Primary School Wagga Wagga, St Paul's Lutheran Primary School Henty, St John's Primary School Jindera and Victory Lutheran College Wodonga (Victoria).

St Paul's College provides a Christian education.

== Location ==
Location of St Paul's College at Walla Walla in New South Wales

St Paul's is located in a rural setting on the northern outskirts of Walla Walla. Walla Walla is a town of approximately 600 people located 40 kilometres north of the cities of Albury-Wodonga and 100 km south of Wagga Wagga; 540 km south-west of Sydney and 350 km north of Melbourne.

== History ==
When the Lutheran forefathers first settled Walla Walla they established their church and a day school. However, this school was short-lived and it was handed over to the NSW Department of Public Instruction in 1885.

The desire of the local community for Christian secondary education led Pastor JTP Stolz to begin the planning that would lead ultimately to the establishment of St Paul's College. On Tuesday 10 February 1948, 28 foundation students answered the roll called by Werner Hebart, the founding Headmaster. Thirteen of these students were boarders and they resided with local families.

The College moved onto its current premises, from its temporary location in Zion church in 1950.

Milestones in the history of St Paul's include

1948 Founding of St Pauls College
1950 Movement onto the present campus
1955 Enrolments pass 100
1963 Emergence of a heightened focus on Agriculture
1966 Enrolment of the first second generation student
1978 Introduction of the Equine program
1979 Commencement of an extensive building program
1985 Establishment of the Vertical care group structure
2000 Enrolment of the first third generation student
2005 Commencement of a program of refurbishments
2008 60 year anniversary celebrations.

Strategic planning during 2008 set the direction for St Paul's future, in line with the vision of its founders, that St Paul's be a "Christ-centred community valuing people and learning."

=== Pastoral care ===
St Paul's has a vertically arranged pastoral care group system consisting of students from Years 7 to 12. This structure, which was introduced in 1985, replaced the typical structure of having a year coordinator assigned to each year group. Each student is assigned to a care group, either within Kavel House or Leidig House and he or she remains in this caregroup for the duration of his or her schooling.

=== Educational ===
Some students take the opportunity to specialise in Equine or Agricultural Studies. The majority of the students who do not wish to gain employment in an agricultural field or have an interest in Equine sports can study other subjects.

As part of their learning, students learn about Christianity and other major religious groups.

Students’ learning in agriculture is supported by practical activities on the College's farms (totalling 92 ha) that are used for livestock, cropping and pasture production. The White Suffolk stud provides experiences in the production of sheep and wool; the preparation and showing of sheep; and the techniques of modern studwork. The College also runs a small commercial herd of cows, along with steers that are prepared for showing and carcase competitions. Show teams visit local agricultural shows and the Royal shows in Melbourne and Sydney.

The focus of the Equine studies programme is on the equestrian industry rather than the racing or breeding industries. The Equine centre includes stables, yards and paddocks, dressage and jumping arenas, a round yard and a cross country training circuit. Boarding students agist their horses at the Equine centre and College horses are available for students who do not have their own horse. Supervised riding takes place after school and boarding students have the opportunity to compete at local shows and gymkhanas.

=== Boarding ===
Approximately 30% of the students are boarders. At various times the boarding population has comprised over 80% of the enrolments with up to 160 full and weekly boarding students. Presently, boarding students are drawn from communities within the Greater Hume Shire, the Riverina, North Eastern Victoria and further afield from the cities of Sydney, Canberra and Melbourne.

Weekly boarding students return to their homes on weekends and College operated transport services are provided to and from Wagga Wagga and Wodonga. Full boarding students remain on campus on weekends.

== Sport ==
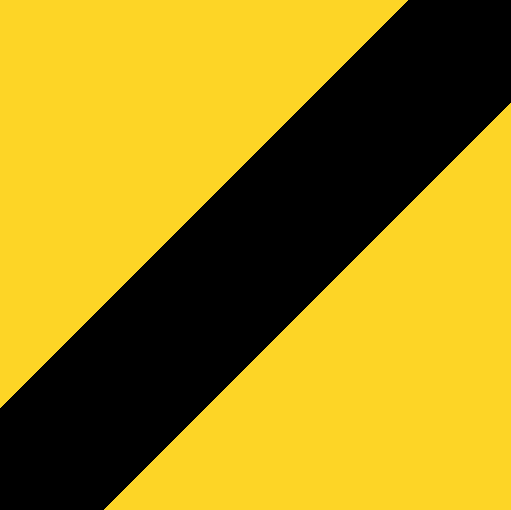
St. Paul's College Football Jumper

The school entered an under 18 Australian Rules football team in the Hume Junior Football League between 1950 and 1985. This team was very successful in winning eight premierships in the following seasons - 1950, 1961, 1963, 1967, 1972, 1975, 1976, 1978 and fostering all the qualities that junior team sports have to offer.

The school has sports facilities to cater to their current students in the forms of:

- Two year round sporting ovals irrigated by reclaimed water from the township of Walla Walla.
- Seven synthetic surface tennis courts, which are shared with the local community.
- The Equine Centre comprising dressage and jumping arenas, a round yard, stables, tackrooms, paddocks and a cross-country circuit.
- Changing rooms and toilet block (construction 2008–2009).
- Refurbished gymnasium.

== See also ==
- List of non-government schools in New South Wales
- List of Lutheran schools in Australia
- List of schools in the Riverina
- Education in Australia
