= Pleasant Hills, New South Wales =

Pleasant Hills New South Wales
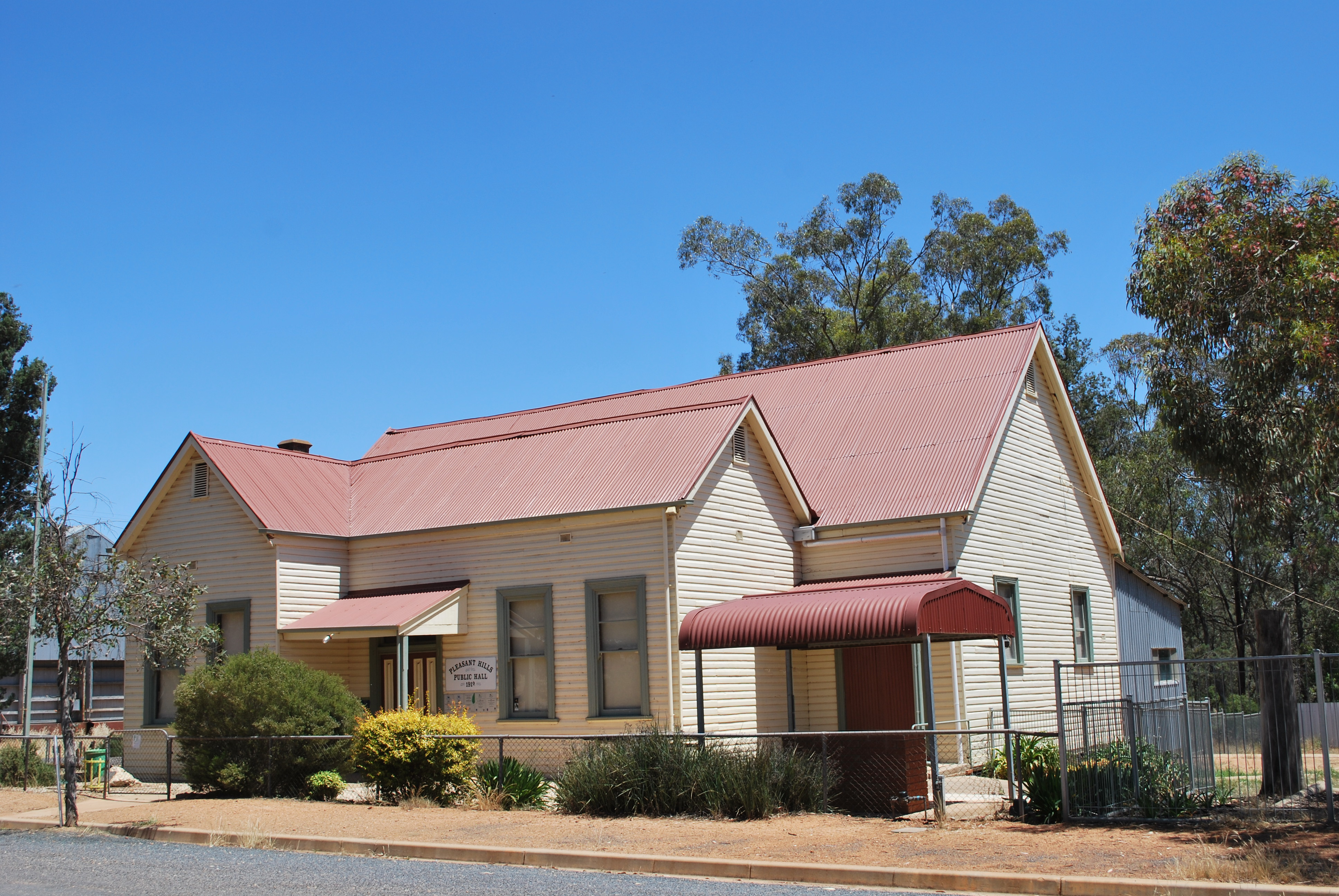
- Public hall, built in 1912

- Coordinates: 35°28′0″S 146°48′0″E
- Population: 127 (2021 census)
- Established: 1892 (as Munyabla)
- Postcode(s): 2658
- Location: 37 km (23 mi) from Lockhart; 26 km (16 mi) from Henty; 85 km (53 mi) from Albury
- LGA(s): Lockhart Shire
- County: Urana
- State electorate(s): Wagga Wagga
- Federal division(s): Farrer

Pleasant Hills is a small village about 26 kilometres west of Henty in the Riverina district of New South Wales, Australia. At the 2021 census, Pleasant Hills had a population of 127 people.

The village still retains a vibrant community and a number of old and impressive buildings. In particular are the Public School built in 1891, the Lutheran Church built (from wattle and daub) in 1888, the Public Hall built in 1912, and the Pleasant Hills Community Hotel built between 1917 and 1918. All of these buildings are still in use today.

The town was serviced by the Rand branch railway line before the line was closed in 1975. Pleasant Hills Post Office opened on 1 March 1890.

== German Settlement ==
Pleasant Hills and the nearby area of Alma Park are closely linked by their common Wendish German (Lutheran) heritage.

The streets of Pleasant Hills display a second set of signage to include the surnames of prominent families that moved to the area during that time. Names displayed include Terlich, Eulenstein, Schiller, Quast, Pertzel, Lieschke, Knobel, Haberecht, Zucker, Pumpa and Scheuner.

== Pleasant Hills Community Hotel ==
The licence of the Pleasant Hills hotel was sold outside of the town in 1999 and this caused the closure of the hotel. The village folk and surrounding community then raised approximately $40,000 so that they could buy the hotel property and after some changes to the State's Liquor Laws established the first Community Licence in New South Wales on March 23, 2000, so that they could reopen this important establishment. The hotel remains a focal point for the community and now doubles as both the Post Office and a small General store.
