= German settlements in the Riverina =

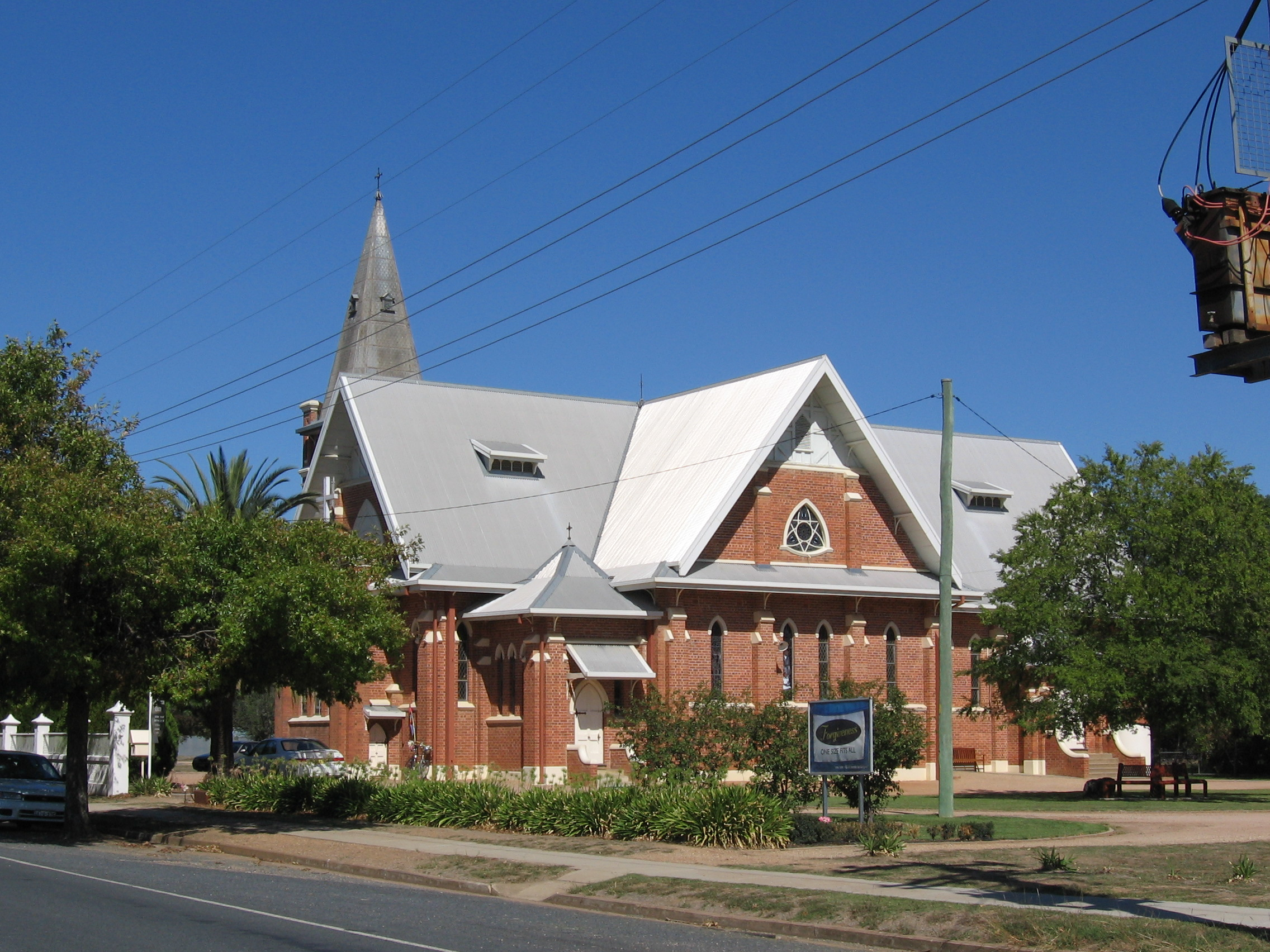
Zion Lutheran Church in Walla Walla. This is the largest Lutheran Church in New South Wales.

In Australia, a number of German settlements in the Riverina were established in the late nineteenth century. The settlements were populated by Germans migrating both from established German settlements in South Australia and directly from Germany. Due to the distinct religious and language difference between the new settlers and the established Anglo-Celtic community in the Riverina, these settlements maintained a distinct cultural identity.

== History ==
Australia became a popular destination for German immigrants from as early as 1838 when religious persecution in Prussia led to the first organised group migration of Old Lutherans to South Australia. What was to follow was a progressive chain migration from the areas in northern and eastern Prussia, that was to last until the end of the nineteenth century. However, with this influx, land soon became difficult to obtain at reasonable prices. Also, land holdings in South Australia proved too small for sustainable cropping with Australian soils unable to cope with the type of intensive farming that was traditional practice of German farmers in the homeland. These factors, combined with the desire of the Germans to live in homogenous communities, their land inheritance practices, and the typically large size of German families, culminated to instigate a second migrational wave from South Australia to the colonies of New South Wales and Victoria from the 1860s. Substantial numbers of German settlers left South Australia to select land in the Southern Riverina.

The Albury region had long been a settlement area for Catholic Germans, particularly farmers and wine growers from the Rhineland, who had begun to melt in with the Anglo-Celtic population. The first South Australian Germans to reconnoitre the Riverina took up land in May 1866. By the end of 1866 Germans had selected seven parcels of land, totalling 1,470 acres (5.9 km^{2}). In the following year an additional 55 properties with a combined area of 7,680 acres (31.1 km^{2}) had been selected by German settlers, while in 1868 a further 51 properties (with 4,503 acres) were selected. While some of those moving to the Riverina were original immigrants who had come to Australia from Germany, the majority were apparently first generation Australia-born Germans. Ethnically, many of the Germans were in fact Wendish or Sorbs, an ethnic community in north-eastern Germany. Even though most were Australian-born, the German and Wendish settlers in the Riverina remained culturally Germans with little if any acculturation to the English environment. This cultural identity could be maintained because these German settlers formed close-knit communities held together by Lutheran Christianity, and also due to their adherence to the German language. As in South Australia, both factors became the distinguishing element from mainstream New South Wales.

While the Germans made up the greatest non-British Isles immigrant community in NSW, their overall numbers were not that large. What made the Germans so visible, was the clustered nature of their settlements: two thirds of all German holdings were concentrated in the four postal town areas of Albury, Jindera (57 properties each), Walla Walla (28 properties) and Gerogery (27 properties) all of which were located close to each other.

== See also ==
- German Australian
- Australian place names changed from German names
