= Alma Park, New South Wales =

Alma Park
- Town
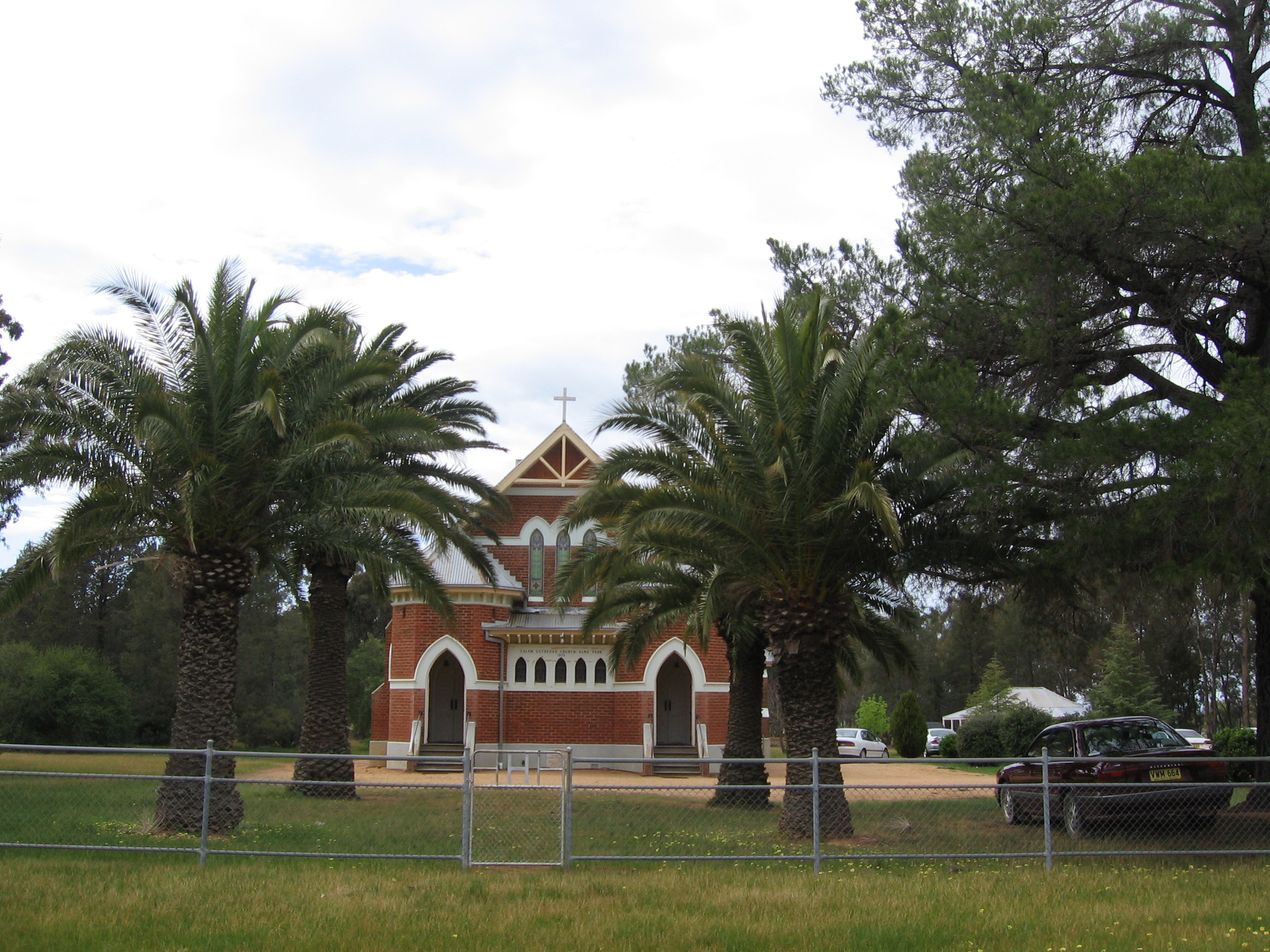
- Lutheran Church at Alma Park

- Coordinates: 35°36′18″S 146°47′24″E
- Country: Australia
- State: New South Wales
- LGA: Lockhart Shire
- Location: 551 km (342 mi) from Sydney; 63 km (39 mi) from Albury; 21 km (13 mi) from Urangeline East; 32 km (20 mi) from Culcairn; 365 km (227 mi) from Melbourne

Government
  - State electorate: Albury
  - Federal divisions: Farrer; Riverina
- Elevation: 216 m (709 ft)

Population
  - Total: 58 (SAL 2021)
- Postcode: 2659
- County: Hume

Alma Park is a farming area closely associated with the Pleasant Hills township situated about 17 kilometres to its north. It is a part of the Greater Hume Shire Local Government Area. While it is listed in some maps and other documents as a town, it is nothing more than an area of settlement that in some cases is referred to jointly with Pleasant Hills, for example the Alma Park/Pleasant Hills Landcare Group

Other than private properties that farm both wheat and similar grain crops and cattle, the only obvious indication of the location of Alma Park is an old Lutheran church that still exists on the Alma Park–Pleasant Hills Road.

== German settlement ==
Alma Park has close links with the Pleasant Hills community particularly with regard to its Wendish German (Lutheran) heritage when a large group of these settlers arrived in the 1880s. At the time Alma Park was referred to as Wallendool.

Greendale Post Office opened on 1 July 1875, was renamed Alma Park in 1905 and closed in 1910.
