= Riverina =

- Region
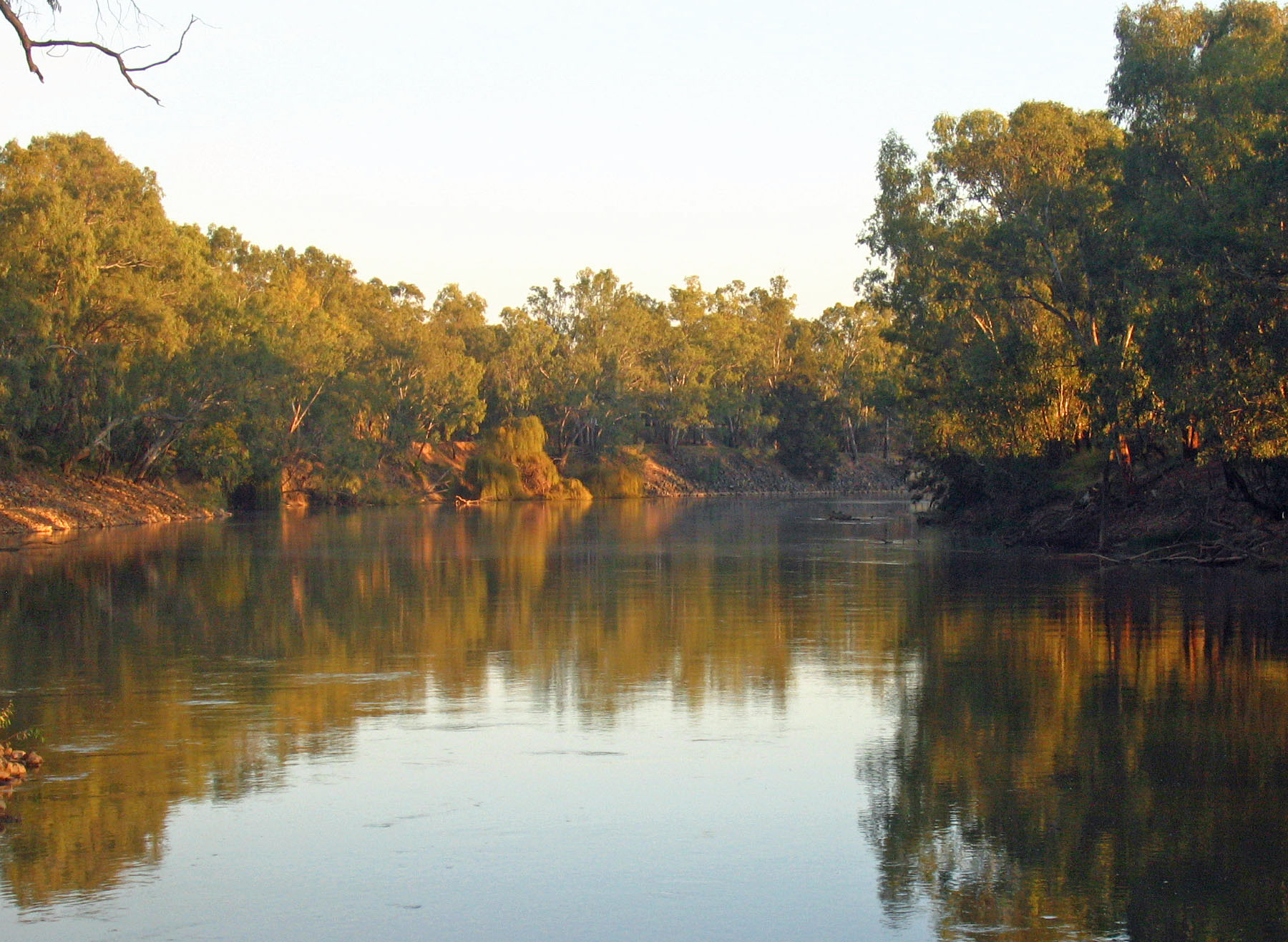
- The Murrumbidgee River at Wagga Wagga
- Coordinates: 35°S 146°E
- Country: Australia
- State: New South Wales
- LGA: Various

Government
  - State electorates: Albury; Cootamundra; Murray; Wagga Wagga
  - Federal divisions: Farrer; Riverina

Population
  - Total: 161,595 – 282,501 (2,019) (Note: The exact population depends on the boundary used. Somewhere between 161,595 (Riverina SA4) and 282,501 (Riverina and Murray SA4 Regions).)
- Time zone: UTC+10 (AEST)
  - Summer (DST): UTC+11 (AEDT)
- Mean max temp: 23 °C (73 °F)
- Mean min temp: 10 °C (50 °F)
- Annual rainfall: 375 mm (14.8 in)
Regions around Riverina
Far West	Central West	South West Slopes
Far West	Riverina	South West Slopes
		Victorian Alps

The Riverina (/ˌrɪvəˈriːnə/) is an agricultural region of south-western New South Wales, Australia. The Riverina is distinguished from other Australian regions by the combination of flat plains, a climate with significant seasonal variation and an ample supply of water for irrigation. This combination has allowed the Riverina to develop into one of the most productive and agriculturally diverse areas of Australia. Bordered on the south by the state of Victoria and on the east by the Great Dividing Range, the Riverina covers those areas of New South Wales in the Murray and Murrumbidgee drainage zones to their confluence in the west.

Home to Aboriginal groups including the Wiradjuri people for over 40,000 years, the Riverina was colonised by Europeans in the mid-19th century as a pastoral region providing beef and wool to markets in Australia and beyond. In the 20th century, the development of major irrigation areas in the Murray and Murrumbidgee valleys has led to the introduction of crops such as rice and wine grapes. The Riverina has strong cultural ties to Victoria, and the region was the source of much of the impetus behind the federation of Australian colonies.

Major population and service centres in the Riverina include the cities of Wagga Wagga, Leeton, Griffith and Albury. Wagga Wagga is home to a campus of Charles Sturt University and two major Australian Defence Force establishments. Albury is also home to a campus of Charles Sturt University which is located in the suburb of Thurgoona and one major Australian Defence Force establishment. La Trobe University has a campus in Wodonga, Victoria.

== Geography ==
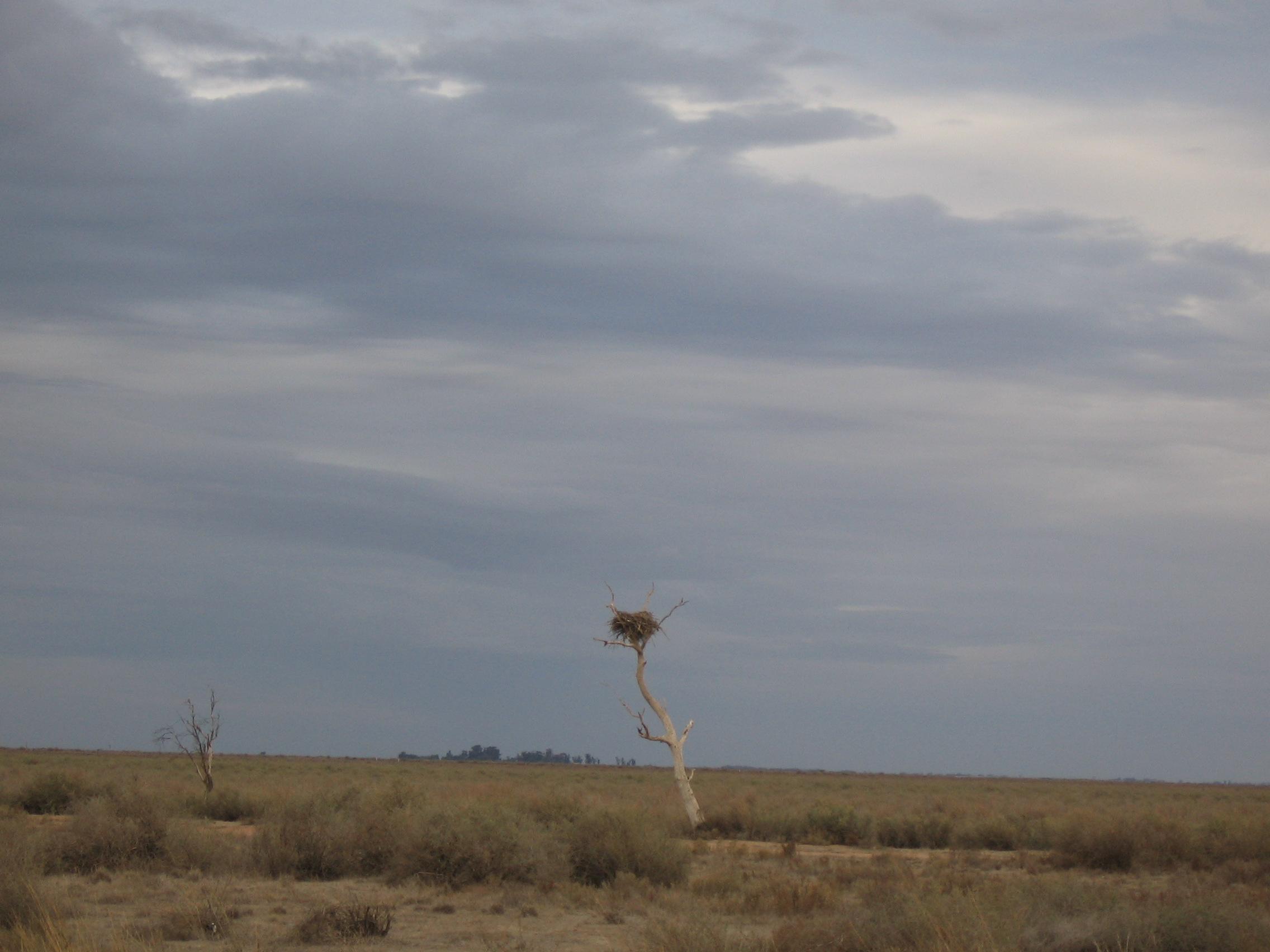
An eagle's nest on The Old Man Plain, an extensive saltbush plain between Hay and Wanganella.

=== Government agencies and other bodies ===
The delineation of the Riverina region varies by government agency or body. Common official boundaries include the Australian Bureau of Statistics' Statistical Area Level 4 Riverina region, Australian Electoral Commission's Federal Election Boundary called Riverina, Natural Resource Management Regions Riverina region, Regional Development Australia's Riverina region and Interim Biogeographic Regionalisation for Australia's Riverina region.

=== Common usage ===
In common usage the Riverina generally comprises the agricultural and pastoral areas of New South Wales, west of the Great Dividing Range and in the drainage basin of the snow-fed Murray and Murrumbidgee Rivers. The northern boundary beyond the Riverina is determined by the Lachlan River catchment area and is referred to as the Central West. Along the Murray to the south, the Riverina borders the state of Victoria. West of the confluence of the Murray and Murrumbidgee is the beginning of the more arid Far West region.

In general, the Riverina is an alluvial plain formed by deposition carried from the Great Dividing Range by streams between 30,000 and 15,000 years ago. The terrain includes rolling hills to the east but then becomes flatter to the west with most of that plain reaching less than 200 metres (660 ft) above sea level. The western Riverina consists largely of featureless saltbush plain.

=== Landform and hydrology ===
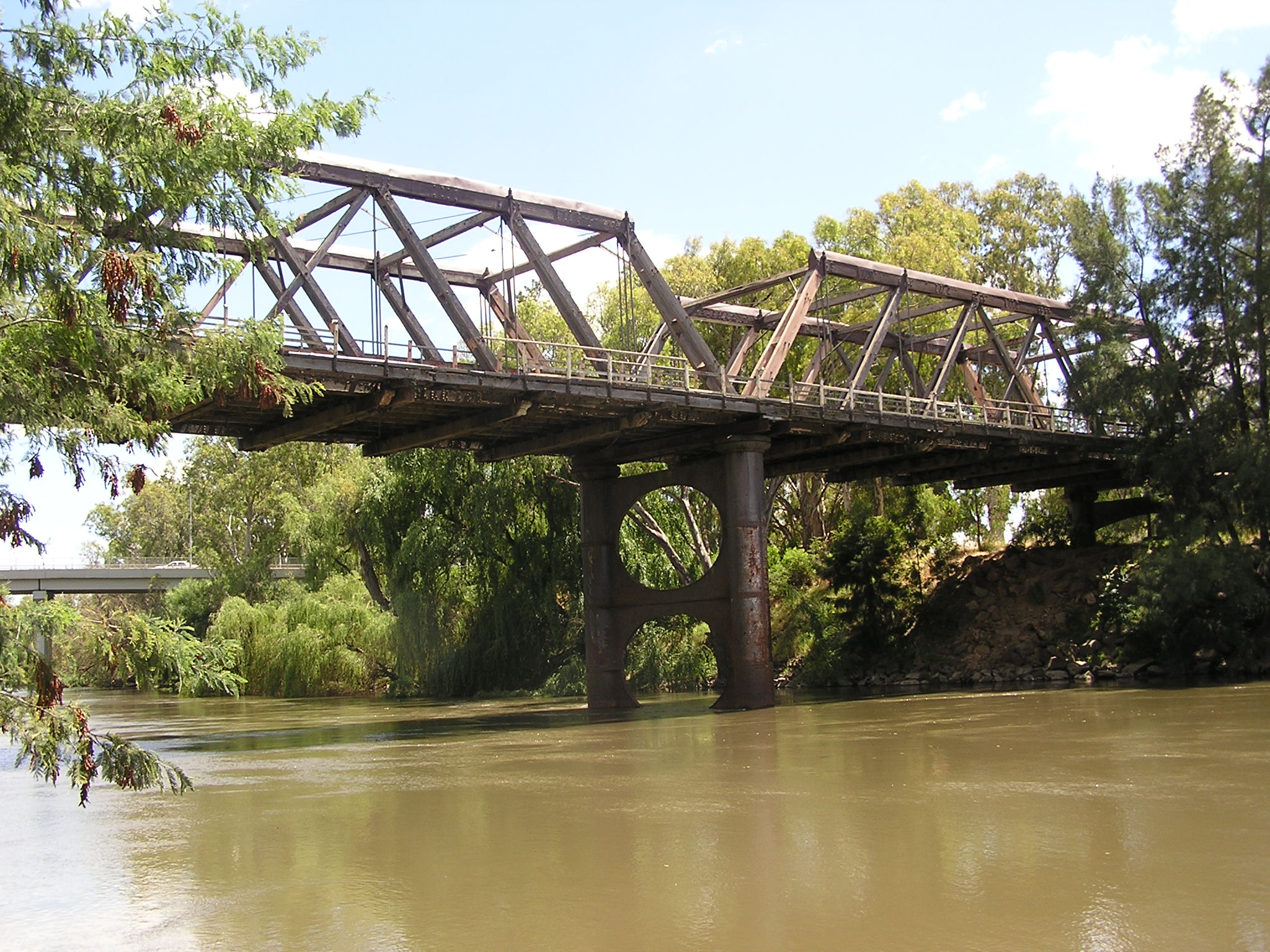
The now demolished Hampden Bridge over the Murrumbidgee River at Wagga Wagga. The new Wiradjuri Bridge is in the background.

The geology of the Riverina comprises several troughs and sedimentary basins. The western Riverina is presumed to be a continuation of the Ballarat and Bendigo geological zone while eastern sections are underlain by western portions of the Lachlan Fold Belt. There is potential for the Riverina to host several mineral deposit types including coal, petroleum, coal seam methane, gypsum, orogenic gold, Cobar style polymetallic systems, heavy mineral sands and possibly diamonds in these fold belt rocks and basins. Riverina soils are generally sandy along the river channels, with more saline grey and brown clays found on rarely flooded areas on the perimeter of the floodplain. As the Murrumbidgee passes downstream, the water and soil become more saline.

The Riverina is drained by the large Murray-Darling Basin. Rivers and streams in the Riverina generally flow east to west. As well as the Murray, Murrumbidgee and Lachlan, other streams include Billabong Creek and the Edward River, an anabranch of the Murray. Much of the water carried by these streams is diverted. In 2001–2002, 52% of the Murray and Murrumbidgee water runoff was diverted, 77% of which was used for irrigation.

=== Climate ===
The Bureau of Meteorology classifies the Riverina in the Hot Dry Zone (with cooler winters) climatic zone. Places in this zone can be very hot in the summer months while in the winter, nights can be considerably cold with cool to mild days. Mean daily maximum temperatures in the Riverina range from 31.0 °C (87.8 °F) in January and 12.4 °C (54.3 °F) in July in Wagga Wagga to 33.2 °C (91.8 °F) in January and 14.8 °C (58.6 °F) in July in Hillston. Under the Köppen climate classification, the region predominantly falls in the hot-summer Mediterranean climate (Csa) zone, although areas in the west of the region would feature the semi-arid (BSk / BSh) climate and those in the east would have a humid subtropical (Cfa) climate, though still with Mediterranean climate tendencies when it comes to the rainfall pattern.

Rainfall levels in the Riverina are generally low with the median annual rainfall over most of the region between 250–500 millimetres (9.8–19.7 in), rising to between 500–800 mm (20–31 in) on the eastern fringe. Because the region is situated on the upwind side of the Great Dividing Range, winter would receive the most rainfall in the year, with areas in the southern Riverina (around Albury), having the wettest winters, while in the north rainfall patterns are fairly consistent throughout the year. Corowa, in the south eastern Riverina has an average rainfall of 539.4 millimetres (21.2 in) per year while mean annual rainfall at Hay is 367.2 millimetres (14.5 in). Drought in 2006 saw the lowest ever recorded rainfall in towns such as Lockhart, Tarcutta and Narrandera.

Despite the very low elevation compared to other regions of the state known for colder winters, snow has been recorded on multiple occasions in Albury and Wagga Wagga, and on 24 July 1936 a flurry of snow was reported in Hay, which at just 90 metres (300 ft) above sea level would make it the lowest altitude that snow has ever been observed to in New South Wales. In Narrandera it last snowed in June 1908, July 1901 and August 1899. The most recent occurrence of snow in the Riverina proper was at Junee in August 2019 – excluding the mountainous parts of the South West Slopes.

=== Riverina bioregion ===
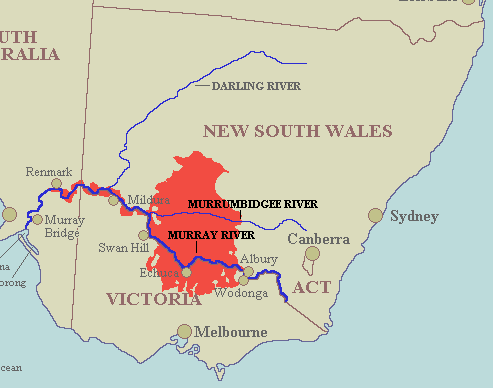
The Riverina bioregion. The Riverina bioregion covers much of the area commonly known as the Riverina but also takes in area as far south as Bendigo and as far north as Ivanhoe.

One method of classification of boundaries for the Riverina is the Interim Biogeographic Regionalisation for Australia that defines the bioregion as an area comprising 9,704,469 hectares (23,980,270 acres), with biogeographic sub-regions covering each of the Lachlan, Murrumbidgee, Murray Fans, Victorian Riverina, Robinvale Plains and Murray Scroll Belt.

The NSW National Parks & Wildlife Service has divided New South Wales into 17 distinct bioregions. Bioregions are quite large areas of land that capture a geophysical pattern which is linked to fauna and flora ecosystems. The Riverina bioregion is an area of land that comprises part of the larger Riverina area but also extends into Victoria. It has been defined by the New South Wales Parks and Wildlife Service as extending from Ivanhoe in the Murray Darling Depression Bioregion south to Bendigo, and from Narrandera in the east to Balranald in the west. 74.03% of the bioregion is in New South Wales, the remainder in Victoria.

In another mapping the World Wildlife Fund has made this area part of the larger Southeast Australia temperate savanna ecoregion that covers the western plains of New South Wales.

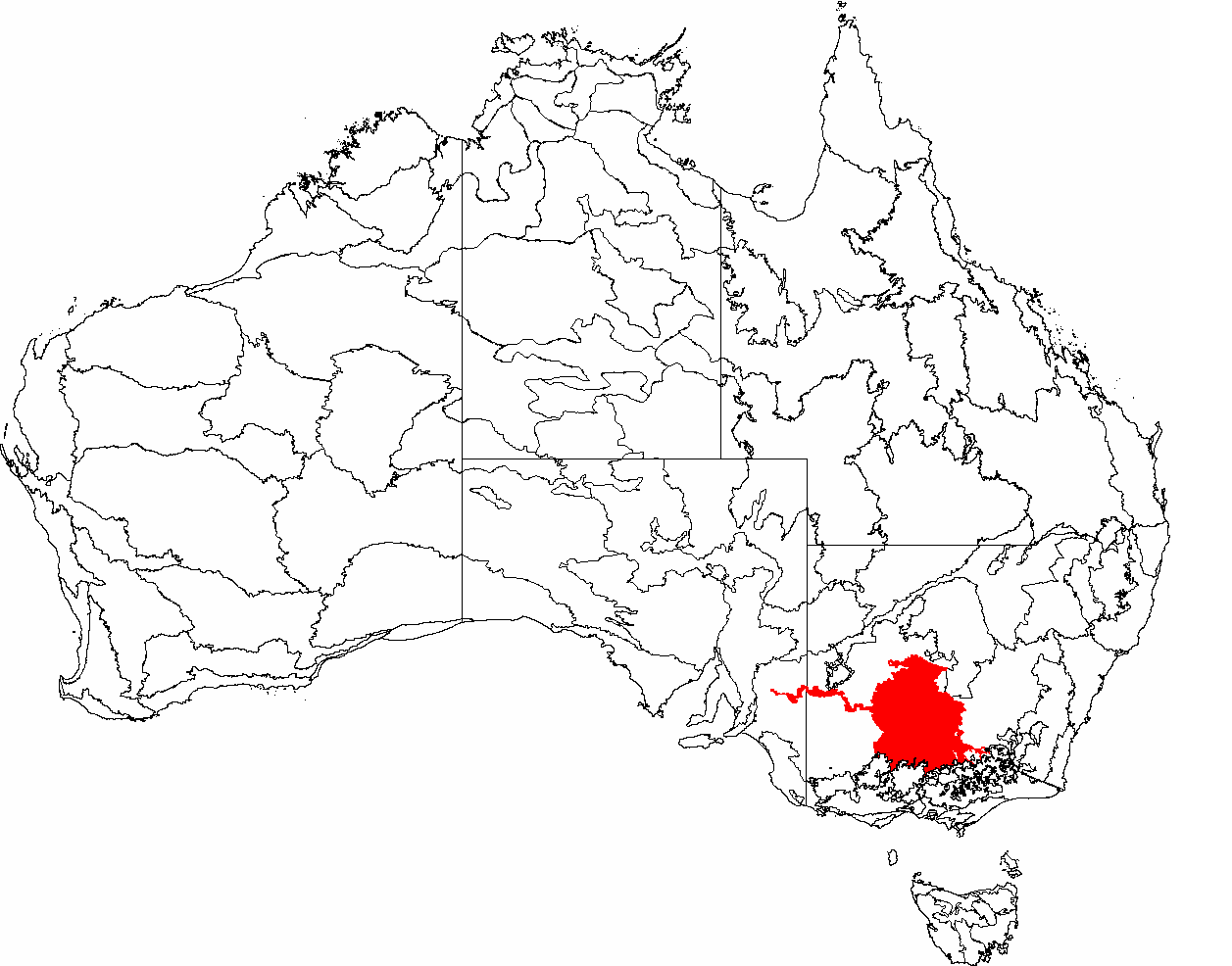
The IBRA regions, with the Riverina in red

River channels in the region support river red gum (Eucalyptus camaldulensis) and River Cooba (Acacia stenophylla) communities. Nearby higher areas contain black box (Eucalyptus largiflorens) woodlands and a salt-tolerant grass, saltbush and daisy understorey. Yellow box (Eucalyptus melliodora) and grey box (Eucalyptus microcarpa) occur along with Cypress Pine (Callitris glaucophylla) on areas rarely subjected to flooding. The area away from the rivers often consists of treeless plains, consisting of various saltbush (Atriplex) species, Cotton Bush (Maireana aphylla) and varieties of Danthonia and Austrostipa native grasslands.

Significant mammals endemic to forests in the bioregion include various species of glider, such as sugar gliders (Petaurus breviceps), feathertail gliders (Acrobates pygmaeus) and squirrel gliders (Petaurus norfolcensis) as well as koalas (Phascolarctos cinereus) A wide variety of birdlife makes its home in wetlands in the Riverina, including many migratory species. Competition from introduced species and the effect of clearing, grazing and pasture improvement has led to a decline in the diversity of native flora and fauna in the area.

== History ==
Aboriginal people are thought to have inhabited the Riverina for at least 40,000 years. The Wiradjuri people were the original inhabitants of much of south western New South Wales including much of the Riverina region along the Murrumbidgee and Lachlan rivers. Other groups living along the Murrumbidgee included the Nari-Nari on the western plains where the town of Hay, the Muthi-Muthi along the Lowbidgee, Gurendji and the Yida-Yida of Oxley. Along both sides of the Murray River lived the Yorta Yorta people inhabiting the area of the Riverina as far east as the present day city of Albury and as far north as the Finley and Deniliquin districts. The Murray was also home to other groups such as the Bangerang, Baraba-Baraba, Wemba-Wemba, Wadi-Wadi, Dadi-Dadi and Paarkantji communities.

The rivers played a leading role in the lifestyle of the Aboriginal people, acting as a source of food and a means of communication and trade. Murray cod and shellfish were gathered for food and bark canoes were used for travel along the rivers. Scars on many trees alongside the rivers are evidence of this extensive use of canoes. In the summer it is likely that the Bangerang and Wiradjuri joined the Monaro groups in the bogong moth feasts in the alpine country to the east.

=== Exploration and pastoral settlement ===
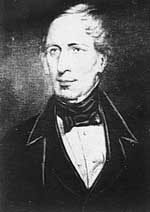
Charles Sturt, the first European to follow the Murrumbidgee River downstream to the Murray.

The first European explorer in the Riverina was John Oxley in 1817 following the Lachlan River to what is now the town of Booligal. Oxley was followed by Charles Sturt, who followed the Murrumbidgee downstream to Lake Alexandrina in South Australia between 1828 and 1831 and Major Thomas Mitchell in 1836 on his way to the Wimmera and the Western District.

Pastoral settlement followed soon after, with grazing runs established along the Murray and Murrumbidgee as far west as Hay by 1839. At the time, the area was known as the Murrumbidgee District. "Cocketgedong" Station, between Jerilderie and Urana, was established in the 1840s by Messrs Brock & Hardie. A map, dated 1864, held by the State Library of Victoria shows them still in possession. At that time, there was little fencing and the sheep were brought back to camps each night by the shepherds. The camps named on the map include Stockyard Camp, Mick's Hill Camp, Columba Camp, The Gums Camp, Coonong Camp, and Sydney Gate Camp. Messrs Watt & Thomson, the owners of an adjoining property, "North Urana", subsequently purchased "Cocketgedong" from Brock & Hardie, giving them a total area of approximately 65,000 acres. In 1904 D & W Gibb, Wool Brokers in Melbourne, purchased "Cocketgedong" which comprised 45,000 acres freehold and approximately 20,000 acres Crown Leasehold. After World War I, the leasehold was resumed for Soldier Settlement blocks, leaving "Cocketgedong" with 36,000 acres and "North Urana" 9000 acres divided by several holdings. The latter part was sold in the early 1950s, leaving the approximate area originally taken up by Brock & Hardie, held by the D & W Gibb Estate. The Woolshed constructed in 1910 consisted of 20 stands, although by 1970 when it was demolished after a new Woolshed was constructed, only 10 stands were being used. The Estate of D & W Gibb sold "Cocketgedong in 1972. Moulamein, in the western Riverina, appears to make legitimate claims as the oldest town in the Riverina, and indeed to being older than Melbourne. The settlers often came into conflict with the indigenous inhabitants. In the Narrandera district, a battle took place between settlers and the local Narrungderra clan at a location now known as Massacre Island, reportedly leaving only one survivor.

Cattle raising was the major industry in the 1840s with sheep becoming predominant in the 1860s. At this time many Victorians settled in the Riverina to breed sheep and cattle to feed the miners taking part in the Victorian Gold Rush. The herds were considered inferior at first, but these pastures were good for stock, and the land which seemed a desert was actually good fattening country. In the 1860s and 1870s, German settlers from the Barossa Valley travelled upstream to settle in the eastern Riverina. Because of their religious distinctiveness as Lutherans, they preferred to form clustered German settlements. In 1867 and 1868 several land parcels were taken up in the Jindera area. 56 German farmers, in 1869, took six weeks to travel six hundred miles in covered wagons to establish the town of Walla Walla. Nearby Holbrook was originally named Germantown after these settlers until changing its name in 1914 as a result of tensions caused by World War I.

The name "Riverine", coined from the Entre Ríos Province (between two rivers) in Argentina, South America, was in use as early as 1857: a long letter under the caption "Riverine Colony" appeared in the Albury Border Post of 24 January that year. The name was coined by Dunmore Lang who translated it from the Spanish.

Dunmore Lang was also involved with the short-lived Riverina secession movement which was active in the 1860s. The movement was inspired by the success of the Victorian and Queensland secession movements and motivated by a desire to draw more public funds to the region and maintain the favourable land tenure the "squatter" pastoralists enjoyed. With the movement strongest in Deniliquin and Albury, Dunmore Lang, squatter and parliamentarian Gideon Lang (no relation) and other influential pastoralists joined with local newspaper editors, George Mott and David Jones in the campaign. This culminated in presenting petitions to the Governor of New South Wales, Sir John Young and the Colonial Secretary, Edward Cardwell. Soon after the movement fell apart due to the differences between the squatters on one side and the small farmers and townspeople on the other causing its objectives to become obscured by other associated issues such as inter-colonial tariffs and rail links.

=== Riverboats and railways ===
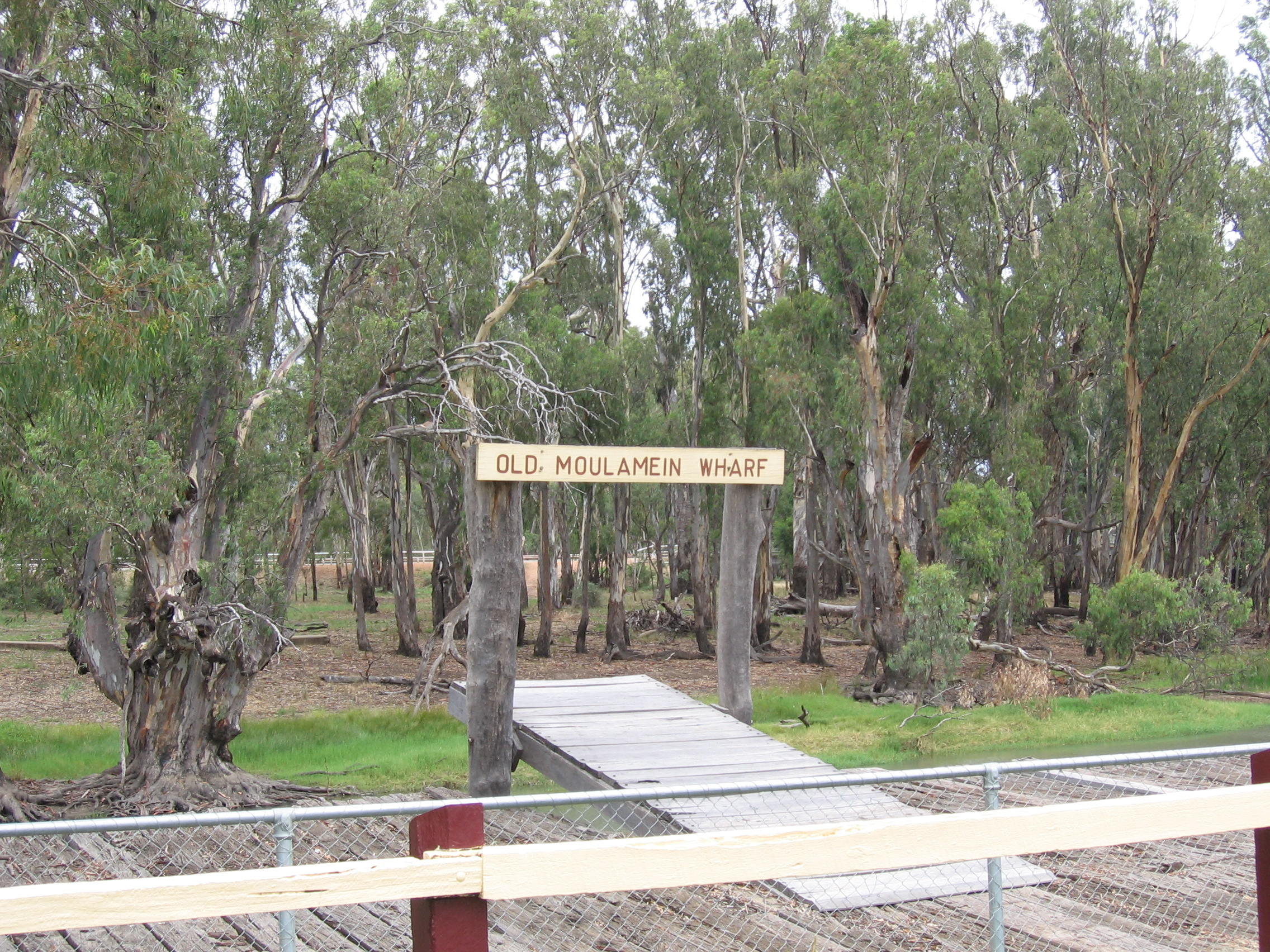
The Old Moulamein Wharf, on the Edward River, was constructed in 1908. Moulamein prospered as an inland port until the coming of the railways in 1926.

From 1853, the Riverina was linked to markets through a series of riverboats along the Murray and Murrumbidgee to the river ports of Mannum and Goolwa in South Australia and from 1864, to Echuca connected by rail to Melbourne. Riverboats reached as far upstream as Gundagai and Albury and towns such as Darlington Point, Narrandera and Moulamein became important river ports. The riverboat era peaked in the twenty years from 1870 to 1890, declining with the coming of the railway and finally ending with the disruption to the workforce caused by World War I.

From Melbourne, broad gauge railway lines opened to Deniliquin in 1876 and west to Moulamein and Balranald in 1926. The Moulamein–Balranald section closed in the 1980s. The North East line reached Wodonga in 1873, and was connected to Albury at a break-of-gauge in 1883, and the Melbourne-Shepparton line was extended to Tocumwal in 1908.

The number of cross border railways expanded with the passing of the 1922 Border Railways Act, with the Benalla – Yarrawonga branch line extended to Oaklands in 1938, both lines meeting standard gauge lines that were subsequently closed. Victorian Railways commenced construction of a railway from Robinvale to Koorakee and Lette in New South Wales in 1924 (the Lette railway line), but this railway was never completed. The Murray River bridge between Robinvale and Euston was instead converted to a road bridge, which will be demolished when the new road bridge currently under construction is completed. The Stony Crossing railway line was built from Kerang to Murrabit in 1924 and Stony Crossing (originally called Poonboon) in 1928 under an agreement with New South Wales. No passenger services were carried on the section beyond Murrabit after 1932 and it was closed about 1943.

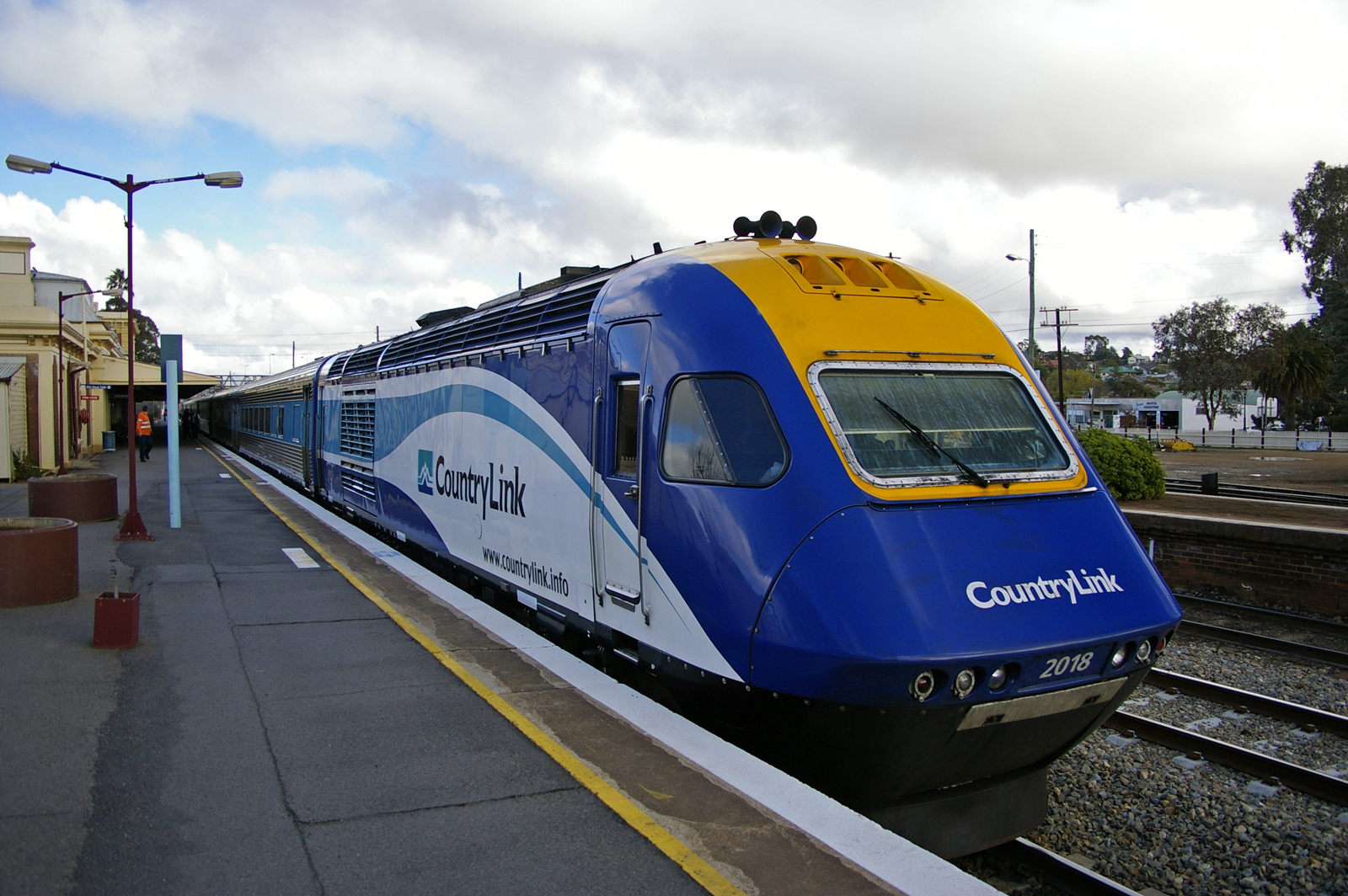
Junee railway station is a junction for the Melbourne XPT passenger service

Standard gauge rail services from Sydney came with the extension of the Main Southern line to Cootamundra and Junee in 1878 and the construction of the Murrumbidgee River Railway Bridge in 1881 allowed the line to be extended past Wagga Wagga to Henty and Albury later that year. A branch line was constructed to Temora in 1893 and extended to Barellan in 1908, Griffith in 1916 and Hillston in 1923. Further south, a branch line was completed from Junee to Narrandera in 1881 and extended to Hay by 1882. Another branch pushed south from Narrandera toward the Victorian border reaching Jerilderie in 1884 and the Murray at Tocumwal in 1898.

=== Bushrangers ===
Transport links assisted the development of the Riverina economy, at the same time areas of the region found themselves under threat from robbery and murder by various bushrangers. Between 1862 and 1865, the eastern Riverina between Wagga Wagga and Albury saw the depredations of Dan "Mad Dog" Morgan. Having previously been convicted of armed robbery, Morgan came to the attention to authorities in the Riverina when he bailed up a police magistrate, Henry Baylis, near Urana in 1863. In 1864, Morgan bailed up Round Hill station, a large sheep farm near Morven, killing a station hand. Later that year, the bushranger shot dead a policeman in cold blood near Tumbarumba. The reward placed on his head reached £1,000 before, in April 1865, he was shot dead near Wangaratta, Victoria.

The infamous Australian bushranger, Ned Kelly, made possibly his most daring raid in the Riverina, at Jerilderie in 1879. After riding overland from north east Victoria, Kelly and his gang in a brazen move captured two local policemen and stole their uniforms. Impersonating the police, they then proceeded to rob the Bank of New South Wales and held the town captive for several days. While in Jerilderie, he sought to have his manifesto published, the famous Jerilderie letter, a rambling 8,000-word condemnation of the colonial administration in Victoria and specifically the treatment of the Irish. Being unable to find the local newspaper editor, he left the letter with a member of the bank staff and returned to Victoria £2,000 richer.

=== Riverina and federation ===
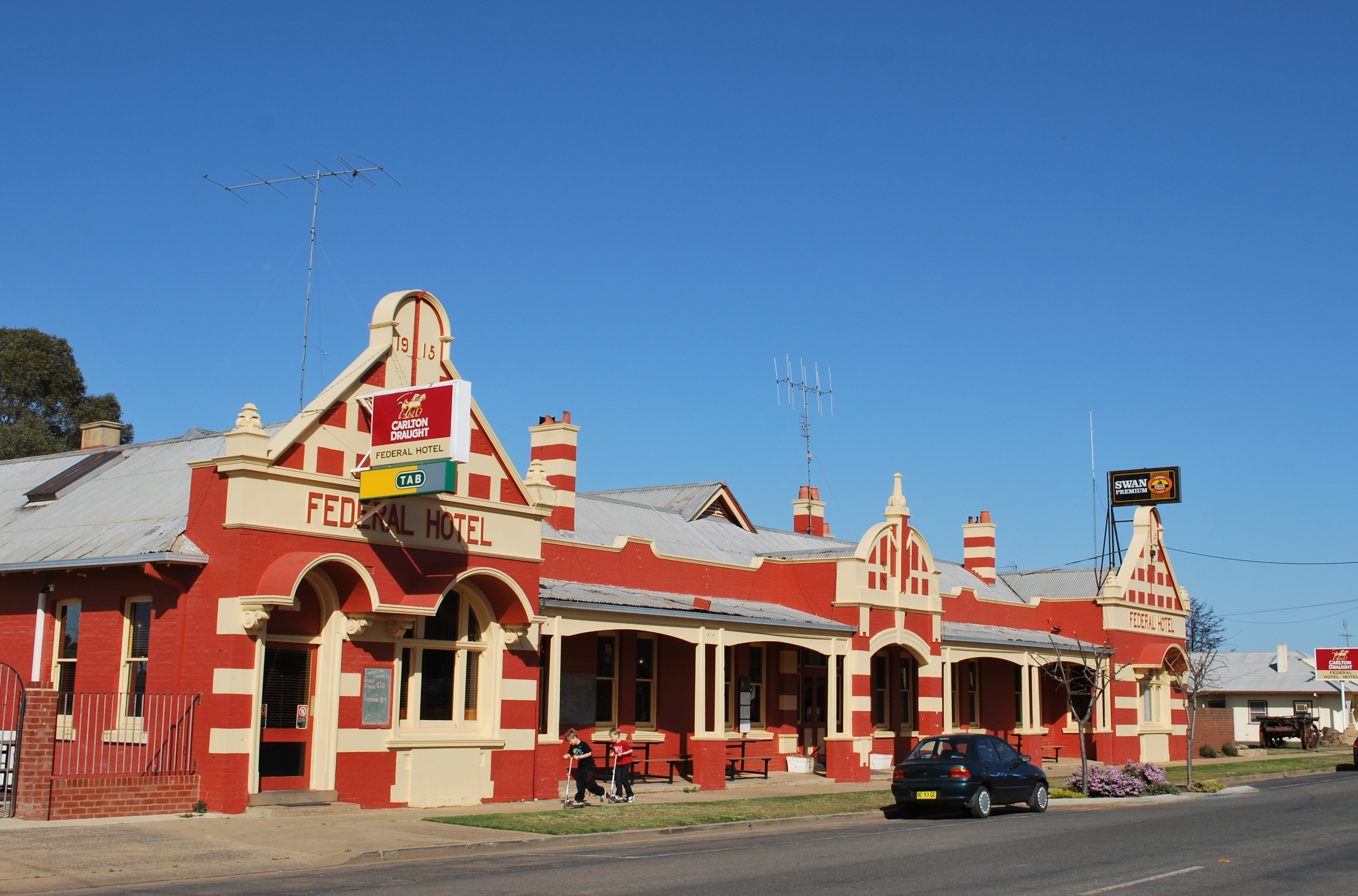
The Federal Hotel in Berrigan, one of a series of hotels built or renamed in the southern Riverina as a result of the Federation campaign

The close geographic and cultural ties between the Riverina and northern Victoria, combined with continuing frustration with inter colonial tariffs, made the Riverina a fertile area for ideas for uniting the various colonies in an Australian federation. This would see the southern Riverina in particular take a leading role in bringing about federation.

Prior to federation, the various Australian colonies could, and often did, charge tariffs on goods from the other colonies, ostensibly for the protection of their domestic manufacturing industries, mainly based in the larger cities such as Sydney and Melbourne. For a border community such as the southern Riverina, these tariffs were a sore burden, making goods purchased from Melbourne, the closest large city, more expensive and reducing the competitiveness of these towns supplying the Melbourne and Adelaide markets. In addition, crossing the border on the Murray River was a tiresome experience as each border crossing had customs posts inspecting goods and luggage to ensure all duty was paid and to reduce smuggling, a popular activity. Another item of concern was the lack of adequate river crossings. Along the Riverina the Murray was—and remains—part of New South Wales, who had no interest in assisting border residents to access goods and services in Victoria that may otherwise have been sourced from Sydney.

In the early 1890s, for mainly patriotic reasons, the Australian Natives' Association helped establish the Federation League, a society dedicated to the creation of a federal nation. Following a series of addresses by the future Prime Minister, Edmund Barton to large crowds, some 15 League branches were established in the towns along the southern border. One of these towns, Corowa, was the location for the first conference of the Australian Federation League in 1893. At this conference, Dr John Quick, a delegate from Bendigo, proposed a resolution calling for the colonial legislatures to pass an act providing for the election of representatives to a convention to develop a federal constitution. This has been seen as the turning point in the push for Federation. The momentum generated from this point lead to a series of conventions and elections and finally, the inauguration of a federal constitution on 1 January 1901.

=== Irrigation and closer settlement ===
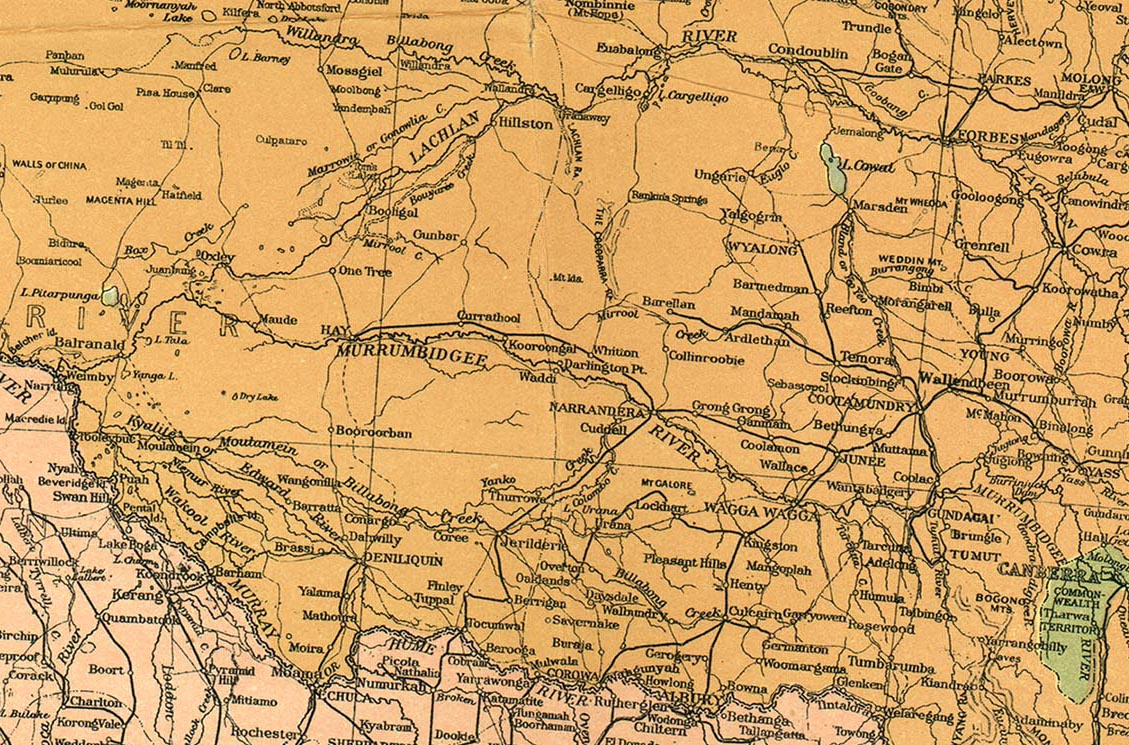
A 1916 map of the Riverina. The area where Griffith and Leeton would later be built was largely uninhabited until the development of the Murrumbidgee Irrigation Area.

Large scale irrigation commenced with the establishment of the Murrumbidgee Irrigation Area (MIA) in 1912 which diverted water from the Murrumbidgee River near Narrandera. The River Murray Waters Agreement of 1915 allowed 26 weirs to be constructed with locks to provide permanent riverboat access to Echuca. When riverboat transport was no longer significant, the weirs supported irrigation. Irrigation in the region continued to develop with the construction of the Hume Dam between 1919 and 1931, the Burrinjuck Dam built in 1928 and Blowering Dam built in 1968.

Development and promotion of the MIA led to large scale settlement on land described by Oxley 100 years earlier as "country which, for barrenness and desolation, can I think, have no equal." Settlers came from a diverse range of backgrounds and nationalities. In particular, the Italian community prospered in the Area, owning nearly half of all the farms around Griffith by 1954. Later, further irrigation was developed for areas in the Murray valley starting with the Wakool Irrigation District in 1932, then the Deniboota and Denimein Irrigation Districts in 1938, the Berriquin Irrigation District in 1939 and the Tullakool Irrigation Area in 1942. The Coleambally Irrigation Area, established in 1968, was the last of the major government-sponsored irrigation developments in New South Wales.

== Agriculture ==
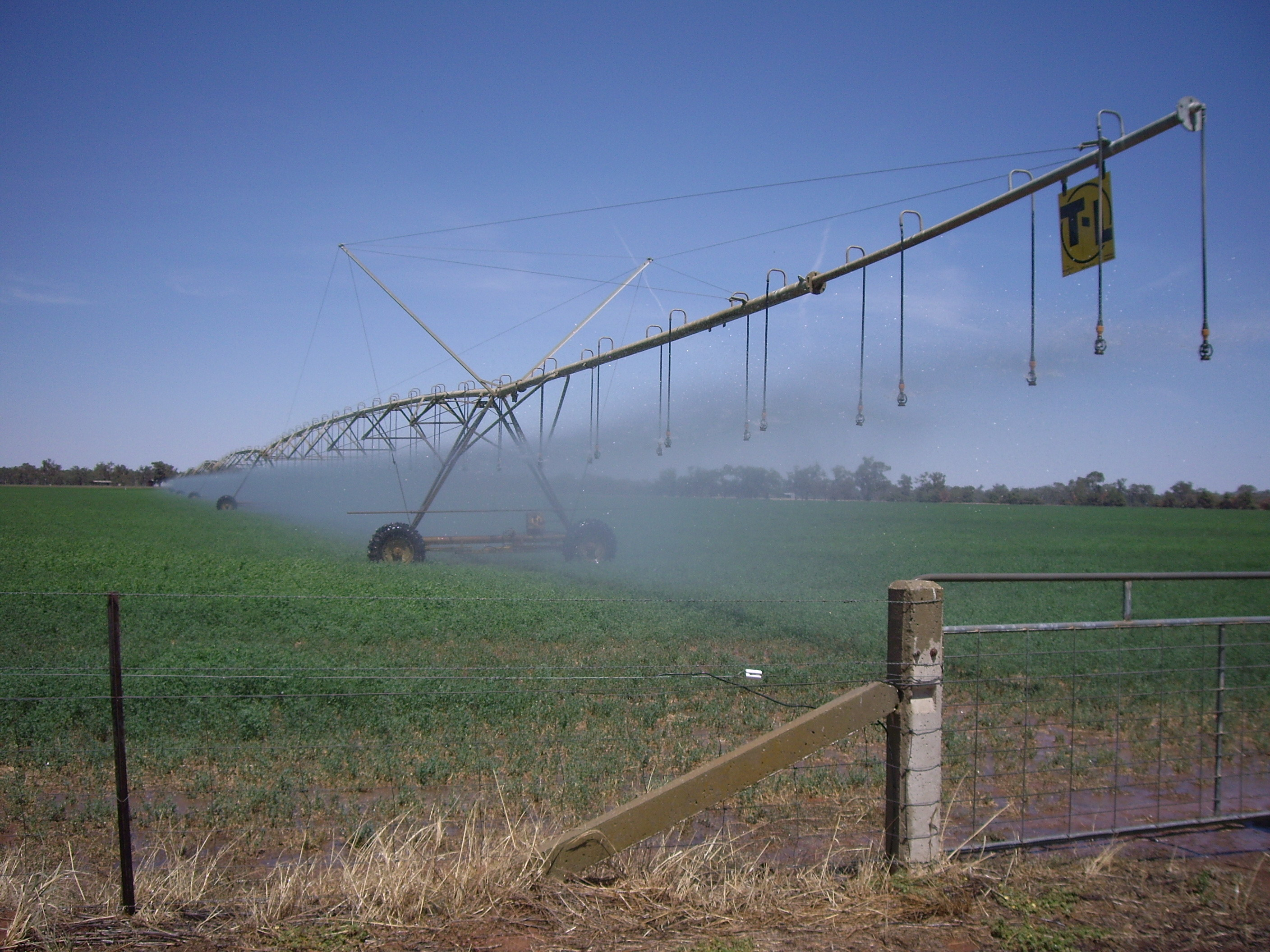
A centre pivot irrigation system near Euberta. Much of the agricultural industry in the Riverina relies on irrigation.

The high soil fertility and abundance of water in the Riverina floodplain has made the Riverina region one of the most productive farming regions in Australia with rice, wheat, maize, canola, citrus and wine grapes being grown in the area. The Riverina contains many irrigation schemes including the Murrumbidgee Irrigation Area. 182,000 hectares (450,000 acres) are under irrigation in the region.

For the first few decades following the 1830s, European pastoral activity focused in the main on cattle production but by the 1860s sheep were the predominant stock.

At the beginning of the twenty-first century, the region's agricultural and horticultural production was worth more than A$1 billion. The region produces:

- over 25% of the state's fruit and vegetables
- 90% of NSW citrus products
- 80% of NSW wine/grape production
- livestock feedlots, sales and processing facilities
- nearly 20% of all NSW crop production and two-thirds of its total value.

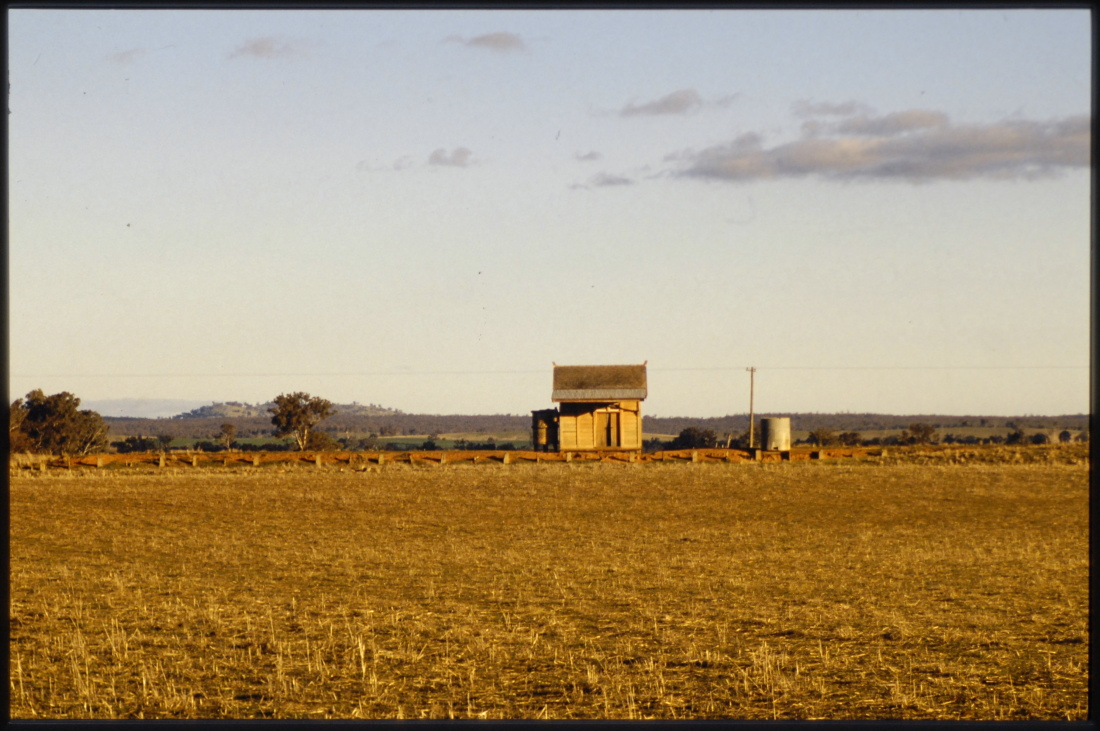
Burrandana railway station overlooking a field of wheat stubble, 1985

In 1991–92 sheep and lamb numbers in the region were close to seven million and there were 500,000 meat cattle. The Riverina is also a significant almond growing region.

=== Wool ===
Much of the dryland areas of the Riverina contain large sheep stations, producing medium class wool. The Peppin Merino sheep was first bred in the area around Wanganella. As many as 70 percent of today's Australian Merinos are said to be directly descended from the Peppin-developed sheep. The Riverina is home to many Merino studs and the saltbush plains are regarded as one of Australia's best wool growing regions.

=== Rice ===
The Riverina produces the vast majority of rice grown in Australia, particularly in the Murrumbidgee Irrigation Area (MIA), but also around the Finley, Coleambally and Deniliquin areas. The first commercial rice crops in the Riverina were grown in the Leeton and Yanco district in 1924, expanding to Wakool during World War II, the Denimein and Deniboota Irrigation Areas in the 1950s and Coleambally and Finley in the 1960s. In recent years, rice is also grown in the Hay, Carrathool and Hillston areas.

Historically, well over one million tonnes of Australian rice has been produced each year and exported to over 70 countries, generating A$500 million in export income and supporting 63 towns in the Riverina and northern Victoria. More recently, drought has drastically reduced this quantity to less than 30,000 tonnes with resultant economic effects. Recent rains however will see this volume increase. The headquarters of SunRice is located in Leeton, Australia's rice capital. Major rice mills are located in Leeton, Coleambally and the largest rice mill in the southern hemisphere in Deniliquin.

=== Wine ===
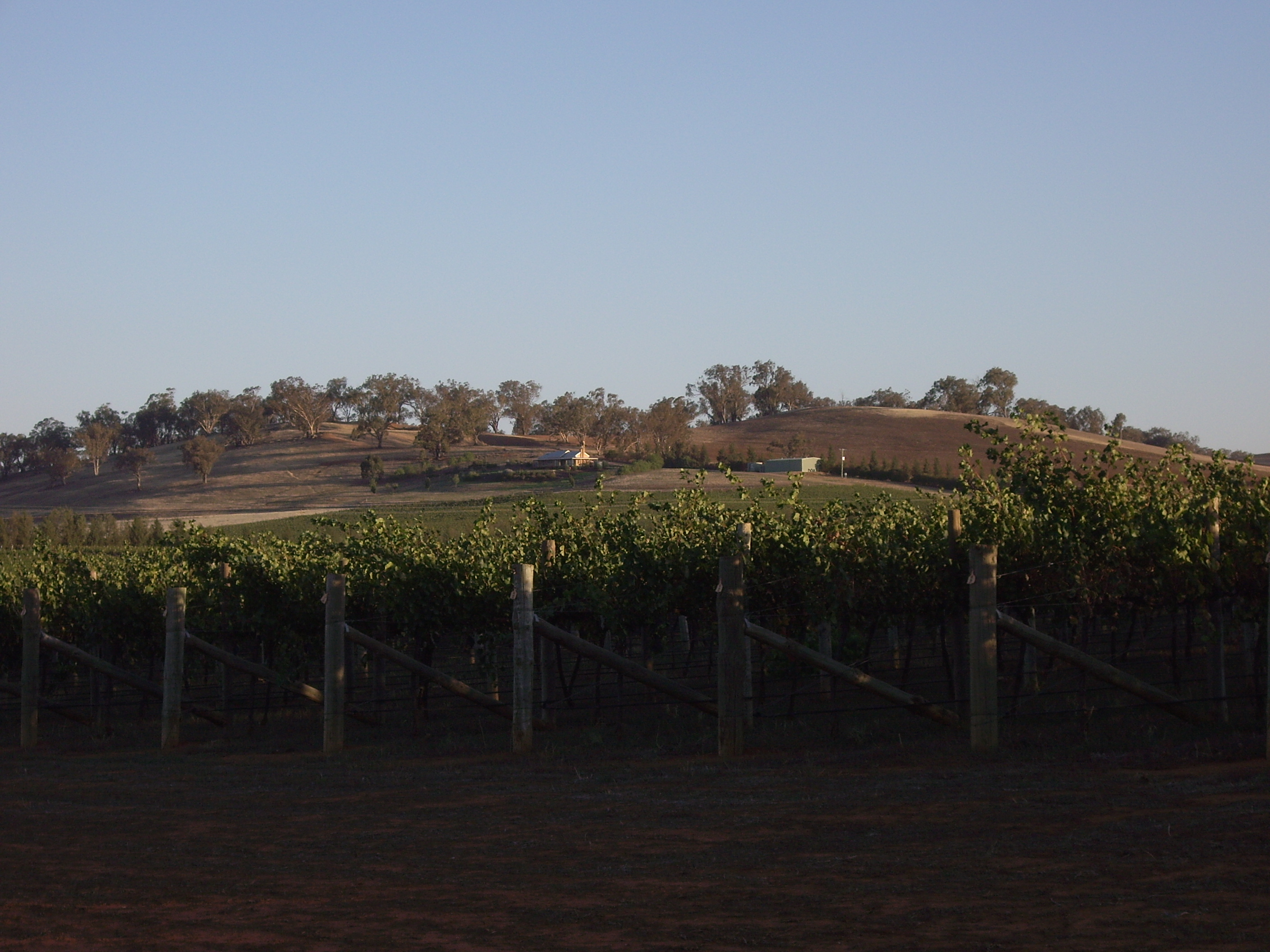
A vineyard situated in Tumblong

The area generally known as "the Riverina" is broader than the area legally defined as the Riverina wine region Australian Geographical Indication (AGI) as registered in the Register of Protected GIs. The Riverina GI is centred on Griffith and is roughly circular with towns on the boundary including Mossgiel, Condobolin, Temora, Junee, Culcairn, Berrigan, Finley, Deniliquin and Moulamein. It does not extend as far south as the Murray River.

The Riverina region is one of the most prosperous grape growing regions in Australia (particularly in Griffith), along with the Barossa Valley in South Australia. The region grows 55% of wine grapes in New South Wales and 15% of the total grape production within Australia and 80% of wine/grape production of New South Wales; the region is Australia's largest producer of wine. Over 50% of the Riverina's wine production is exported. As a producer of specialist wine grapes, its wine style of international importance is Botrytised Semillon and the outstanding speciality made from these grapes is a "sauternes-style" dessert wine.

Irrigation made it possible to grow grapes for wine. The first grapes were planted at Hanwood in the spring of 1913 by John McWilliam and his eldest son Jack who had come to the district from their winery in Junee. Irrigation was by carting of water until the irrigation channels were opened a few months later. The first grapes were picked in 1916 and sent to Junee for processing. Penfolds established its winery in the region in 1919.

== Cities, towns and settlements ==
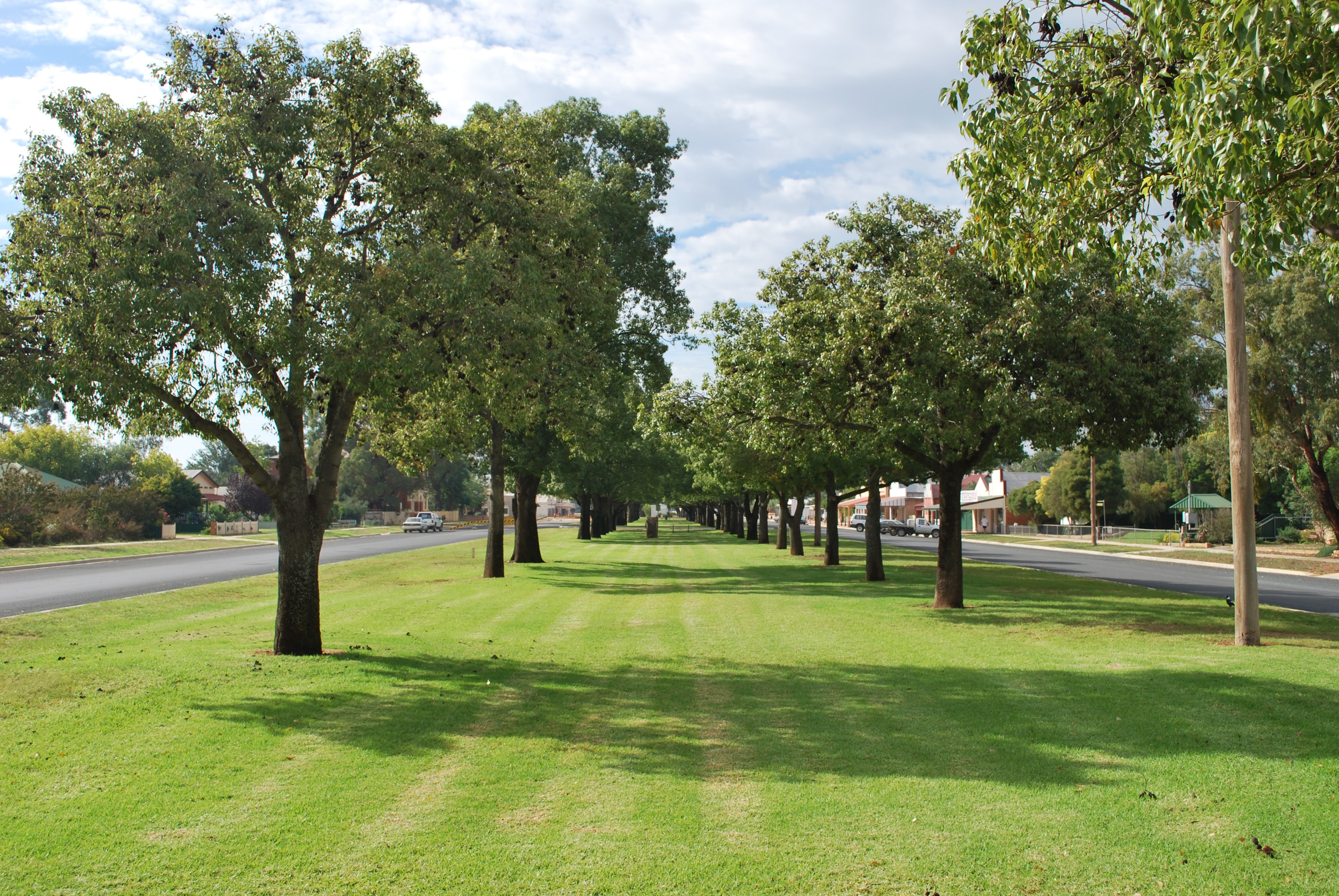
The Rock

At the 2016 census, the population of the Riverina (ABS SA4 Region) was 155,934, 5.4% of whom were indigenous and 18.4% born outside Australia. In common usage the Riverina often includes parts of the Murray SA4 region, as of 2016 the population of Murray was 115,803, 3.4% of the population were indigenous and 17.7% were born outside of Australia.

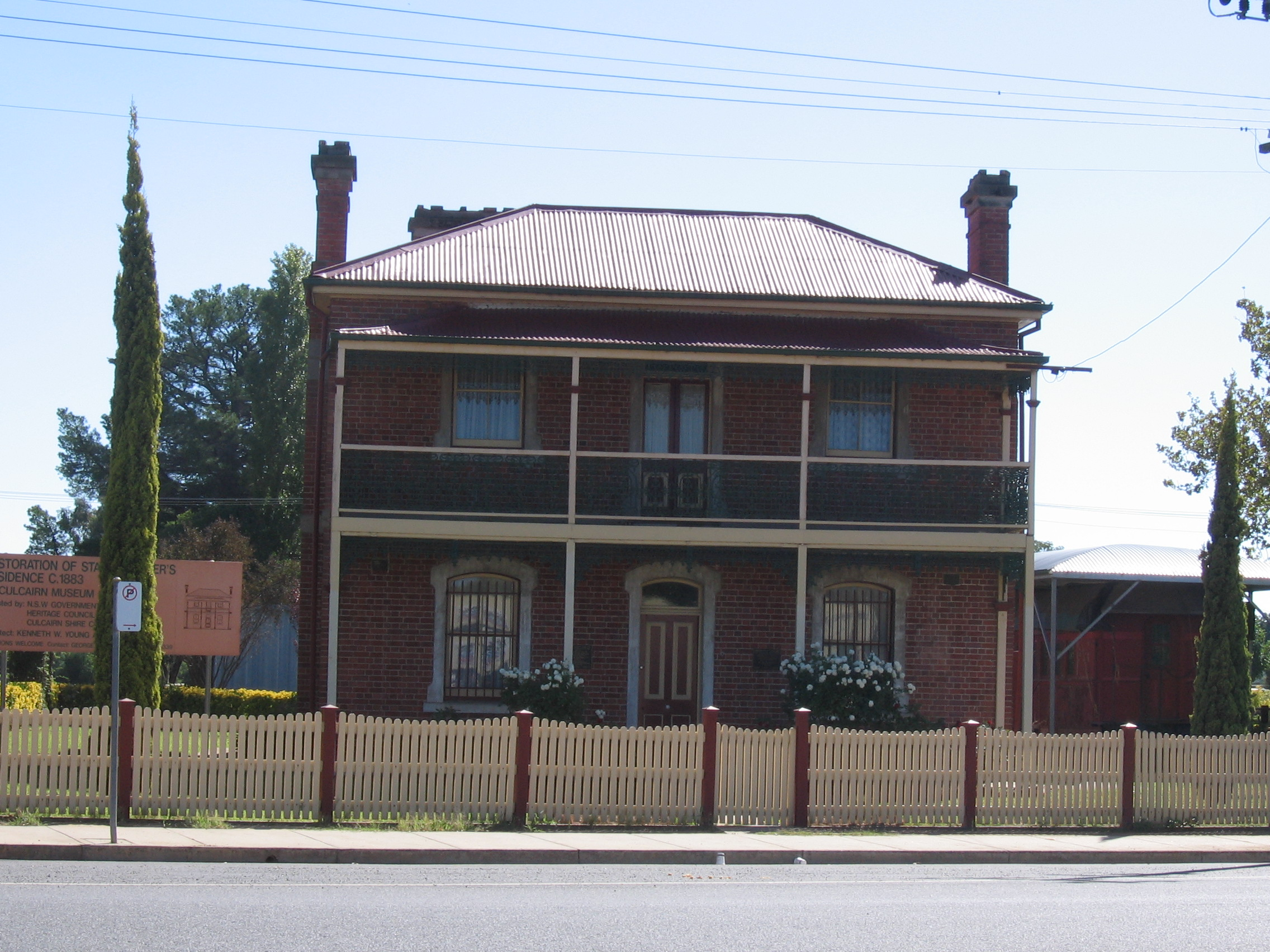
The Station Master's Residence in the town of Culcairn in the eastern Riverina. Many of the buildings in Culcairn, including this one, are heritage listed.

The Riverina includes two cities; Wagga Wagga and Griffith. Other large towns include Leeton, Finley, Deniliquin, Cootamundra, West Wyalong, Narrandera, Junee and Temora. Wagga Wagga is the largest inland city in New South Wales with an estimated resident population of 56,675 people in 2019 and serves as an important employment, educational, cultural, social and entertainment centre for surrounding towns throughout the Riverina. Wagga Wagga's facilities are of metropolitan standards with shopping, cafes, recreational facilities and nightlife present within the city. The two largest centres in population in the region after Wagga Wagga are Griffith and Leeton and they provide advanced services to the outlying farming regions.

Parts of the Riverina experienced substantial population growth in the late 1990s and early 2000s; in the five-year period between 1996 and 2001, Griffith's population increased by 10.8%. Until recently Wagga Wagga's population was declining slowly and ageing with strong growth in age groups 40 and over. This has now changed and Wagga Wagga has become one of Australia's leading examples of the "sponge" city phenomenon, attracting residents from smaller towns in the Riverina such as Urana. In the year ended 30 June 2006, the population of Wagga Wagga grew by 1.3%, driven by its role as the regional centre for the Riverina and its hosting of a campus of Charles Sturt University and Australian Defence Force bases.

The Local Government Area of Temora experienced a population decline in the early 2000s, dropping from 6288 people in 2001 to a low of 5936 in 2009. Since then the LGA has grown steadily. As of 2019 the estimated resident population of Temora has now expanded to 6307 people.

== Politics ==
The Riverina is politically conservative and leans towards the National Party on both the federal and state level.

The Riverina is represented at the federal level in two divisions of the Australian House of Representatives, the Division of Riverina, covering the Murrumbidgee valley; and the Division of Farrer, the area along the Murray River. As of the 2019 federal election, Riverina is held by the National Party and Farrer by the Liberal Party, who, in coalition, are the governing parties. At the state level, the electoral districts of Albury, Cootamundra, Murray and Wagga Wagga cover the Riverina region.

There are a range of local government authorities in the region, ranging from the cities of Wagga Wagga and Griffith; to the municipalities of Edward River, Federation, Cootamundra-Gundagai, Murray River, Murrumbidgee and Snowy Valleys; and the shires of Balranald, Berrigan, Carrathool, Coolamon, Greater Hume, Hay, Junee, Leeton, Lockhart, Narrandera, Bland and Temora. These councils are arranged into Regional Organisations of Councils (ROC)s: Riverina and Murray ROC and Riverina Eastern ROC.

== Health ==
In 2015, 33.1% of the region's population was obese, somewhat higher than the national average.

== Facilities and services ==
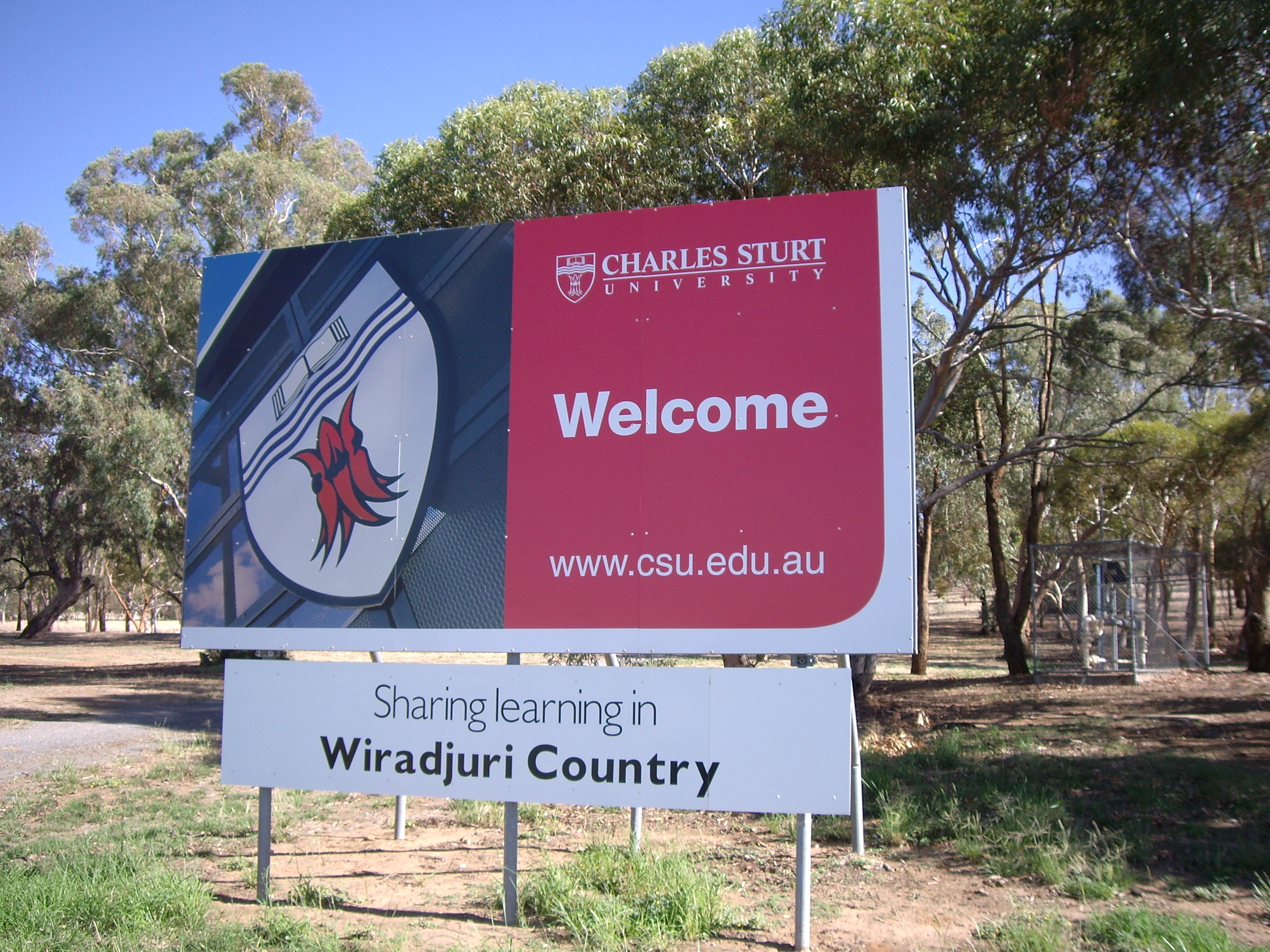
The entrance sign to the Wagga Wagga campus of Charles Sturt University. The sign recognises the Wiradjuri people as the traditional owners of the area.

Higher education in the Riverina is provided by Charles Sturt University (CSU), with campuses serving the Riverina in Albury and Wagga Wagga. The university was established in 1989 with the amalgamation of the Albury and Wagga Wagga campuses of the Riverina-Murray Institute of Higher Education with the Mitchell College of Advanced Education in Bathurst. CSU provides specialist services to the Riverina in areas such as viticulture and winemaking.

Other educational facilities in the region include TAFE NSW, providing technical and vocational training at a number of campuses throughout the region including in West Wyalong, Cootamundra, Griffith, Hay, Leeton, Narrandera, Tumut, Temora, and Wagga Wagga. Most larger centres have public high schools and most smaller centres are serviced by a public primary school.

The health service in the Riverina is administered by Murrumbidgee Local Health District. Base Hospitals are located at Albury, Wagga Wagga and Griffith while Deniliquin, Hillston, Henty and Narrandera among others are home to regional hospitals.

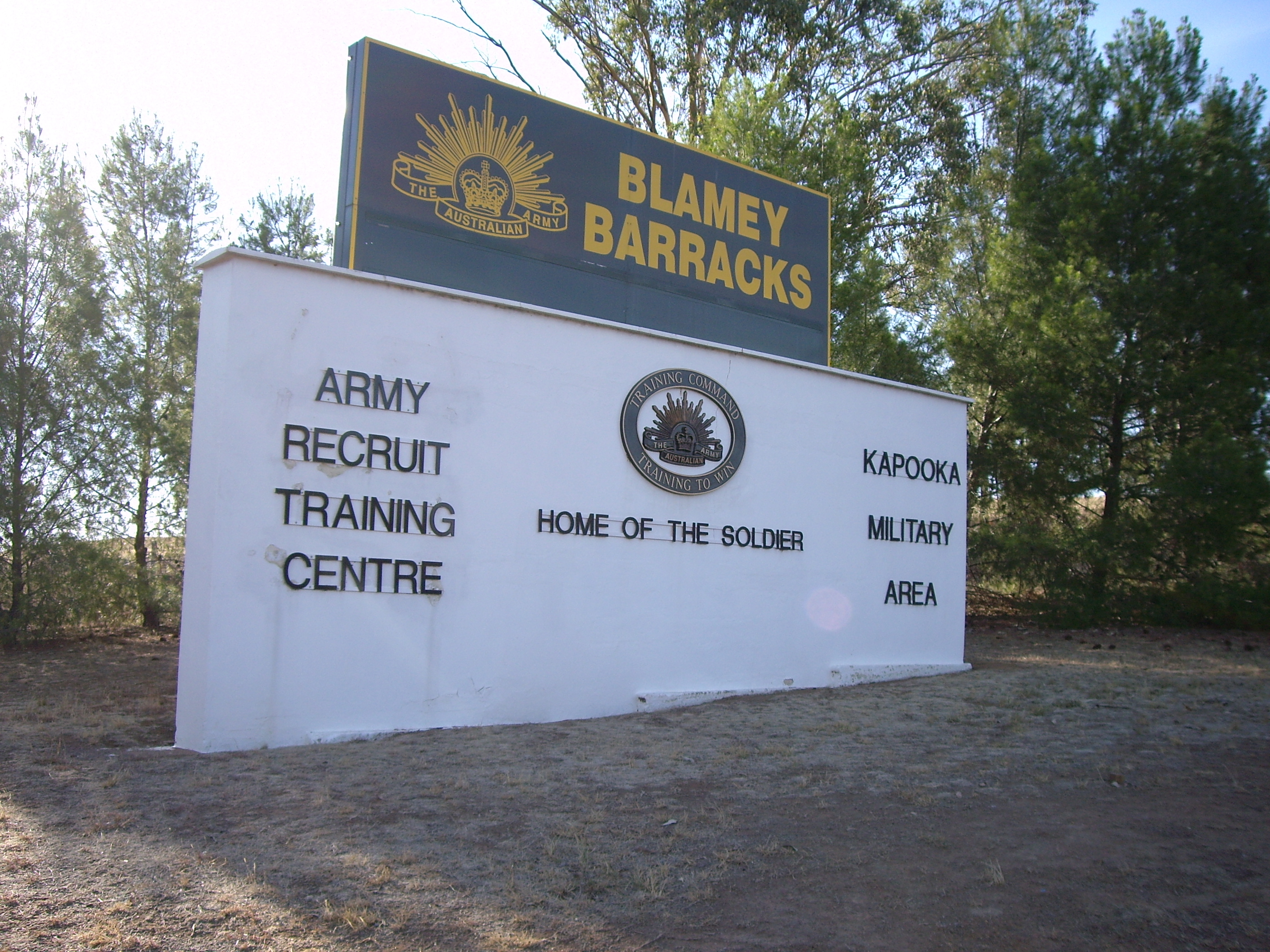
The Army Recruit Training Centre in Wagga Wagga is the commencement training centre for almost all army personnel in Australia.

Situated between the large cities of Melbourne, Sydney and Adelaide, the Riverina is a transportation hub. Major transportation links in the region include the Hume Highway, Newell Highway and Sturt Highway; all part of the Australian National Highway. Other highways include the Riverina Highway, Cobb Highway, Olympic Highway, Kidman Way, Irrigation Way and Burley Griffin Way.

NSW TrainLink rail services from Sydney to Griffith and Melbourne serve the Riverina with connecting buses reaching smaller communities. V/Line provide services linking Griffith, Deniliquin and the towns along the Murray with public transport access to Melbourne.

Wagga Wagga Airport and Griffith Airport are two of the region's main airports that provide direct flights to Sydney and Melbourne.

The Riverina is host to two major Australian Defence Force training facilities. The Army Recruit Training Centre is located at Kapooka, 9.5 kilometres (5.9 mi) south west of Wagga Wagga and RAAF Base Wagga is the home of the RAAF Ground Training Wing base. These bases along with a Royal Australian Navy Defence Communications Station play an integral role in the local economy.

== Sports ==
The Riverina is well known for the quality and range of its sports activity and many famous sportsmen and women have hailed from the Riverina. These include:

- Tennis champions Margaret Court and Evonne Goolagong Cawley
- Cricketers Mark Taylor, Geoff Lawson and Michael Slater
- Rugby league players Peter Sterling and Laurie Daley and the Mortimer brothers: Chris Mortimer, Peter Mortimer and Steve Mortimer
- Australian rules footballers Haydn Bunton Senior, Paul Kelly, Brett Kirk, Shane Crawford, Wayne Carey
- Soccer players Archie Thompson and Joshua Kennedy.
- Jockeys Arthur "Scobie" Breasley and Roy Higgins.
- Basketball great Lauren Jackson.

The "Wagga Effect" is a term that has been used frequently in the Australian media to describe the disproportionately large number of elite sportsmen and women that originate from the town. It is speculated that the phenomenon may arise in rural areas where the population is large enough to sustain the presence of a large number of sporting codes, but small enough to ensure that talented individuals are exposed to adult-level competition at an earlier age.

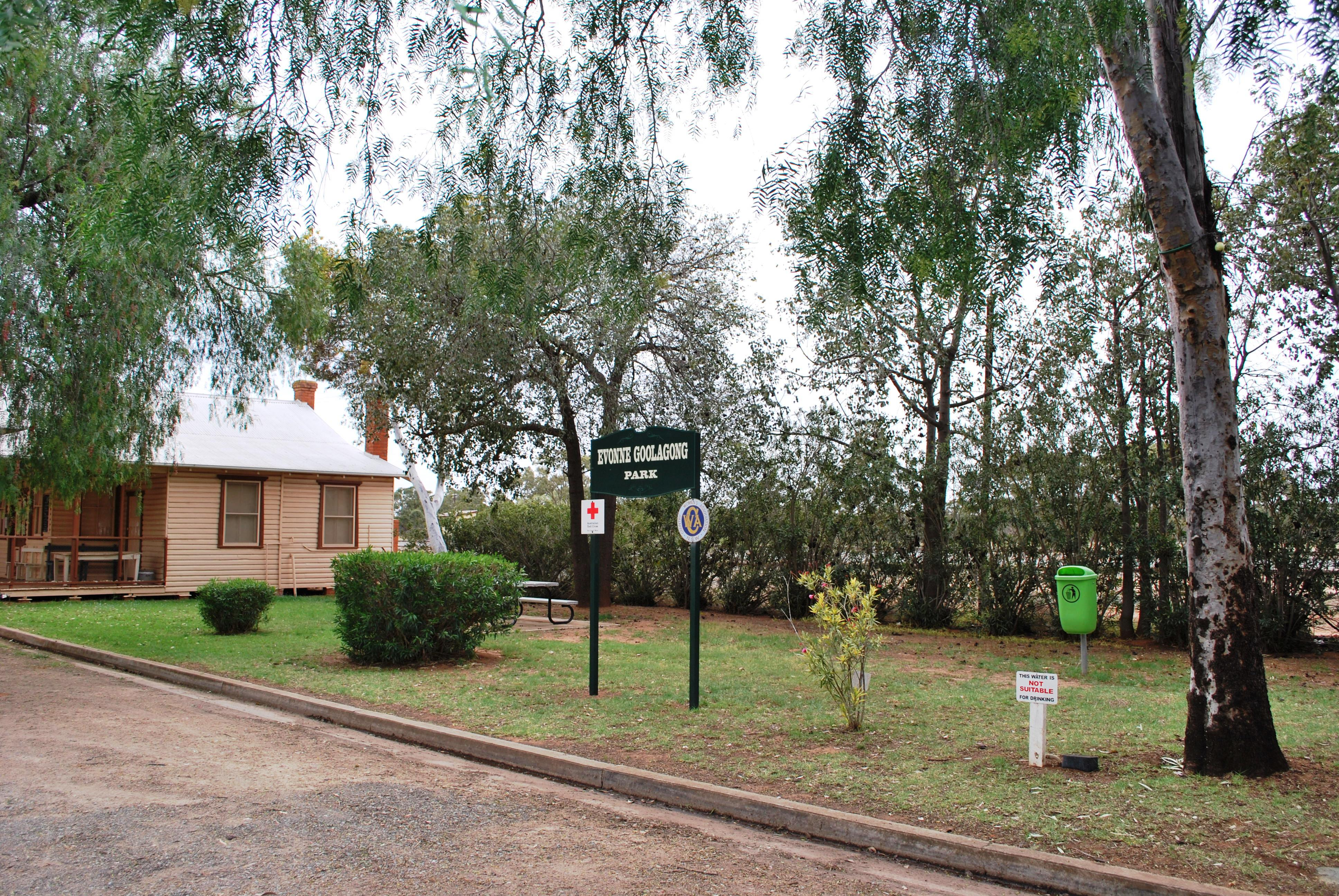
Evonne Goolagong Park in Barellan, the home town of the dual Wimbledon champion.

Unusually for New South Wales, Australian rules football is quite popular in the Southern Riverina as it is south of the Barassi Line, and there are many clubs and leagues in the district, including the Riverina Football League, Farrer Football League, Hume Football League, Northern Riverina Football League and Coreen & District Football League. In addition, many clubs along the border play in Victorian leagues such as the Ovens & Murray Football League, Murray Football League, Picola & District Football League and the Golden Rivers Football League.

In the northern part of the Riverina, Rugby league and Rugby Union are both strong, with rugby league being the most popular sport. Rugby League competitions in the district include Group 9 (Wagga Wagga and districts), Group 17 (Hillston and districts) and Group 20 (Griffith and districts). Teams from Corowa and Albury play in the Goulburn Murray Rugby League. Rugby Union in the district is run by the ACT and Southern NSW Rugby Union, with clubs from Albury, Wagga Wagga, Cootamundra, Temora and Hay as well as many others competing in the Southern Inland Rugby Union.

Other popular sports in the Riverina include cycling, bowls, cricket, netball, tennis and horse racing. The Riverina is home to many racecourses and picnic race meetings are held regularly at places such as Corowa, Berrigan, Carrathool, Tumut and Lockhart.

== Media ==
Radio stations that broadcast to the region are:

- ABC Riverina serving region-wide (part of ABC Local Radio)
- ABC Goulburn Murray covering Albury (part of ABC Local Radio)
- Triple M Riverina serving Wagga Wagga and most of the region (commercial)
- Triple M Riverina MIA serving Griffith and MIA areas (commercial)
- Triple M The Border serving Albury (commercial)
- Hit104.9 The Border serving Albury (commercial)
- HIT93.1 (commercial)
- 2AAA serving Wagga Wagga (community)
- 2MIA serving Griffith and MIA areas (community)

Other electronic media are represented by the Australian Broadcasting Corporation with both television and radio broadcasting; and by television stations Prime7, Nine, and Southern Cross 10.

== Culture ==
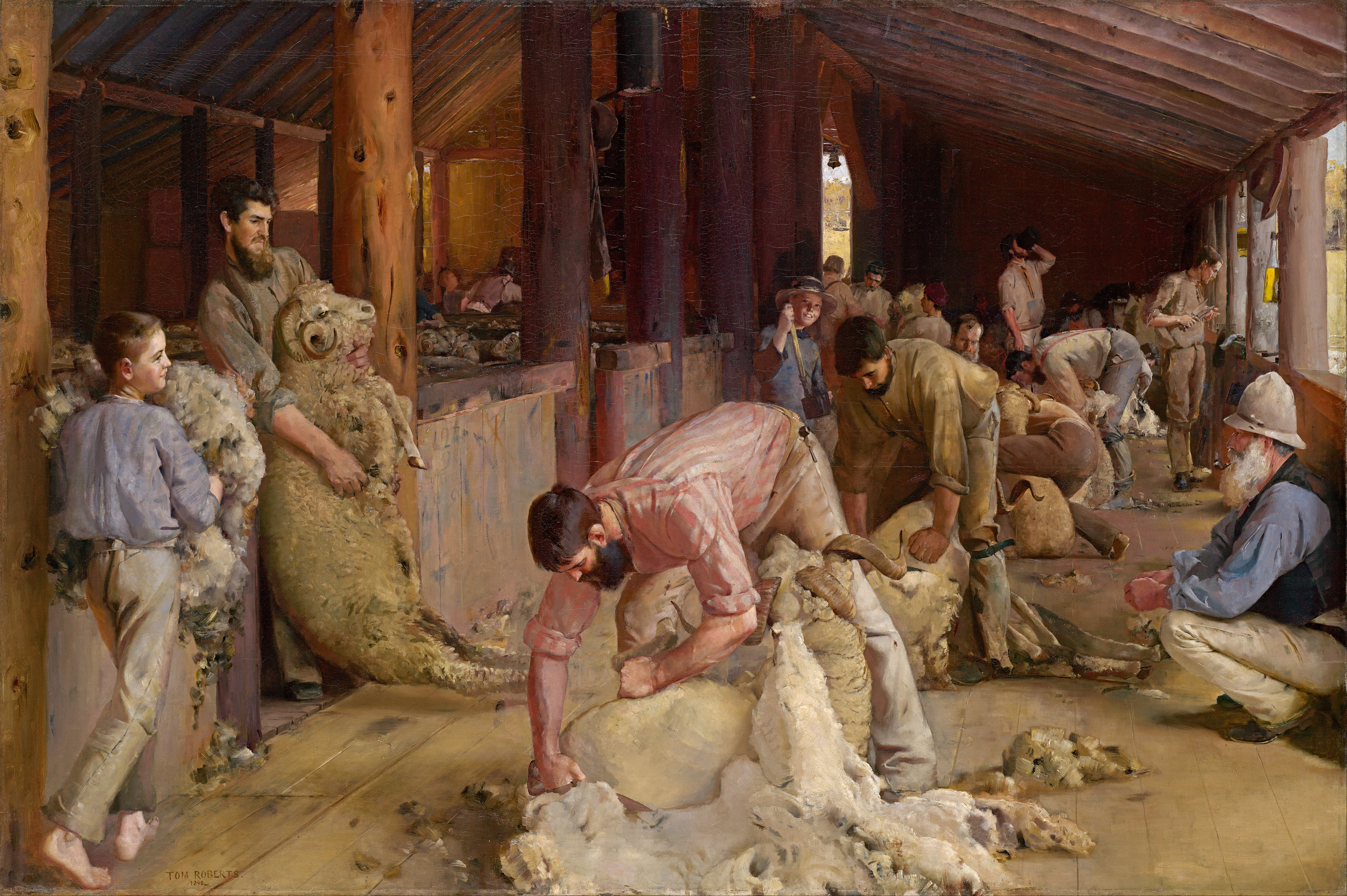
Shearing the Rams (1890). Oil on canvas on composition board. The artist Tom Roberts spent some time at Brocklesby station prior to the composition of this painting.

The Riverina was the setting for some of Australia's great artistic and literary works of the 19th and early 20th century. Most of these works reflected the rural lifestyle and agricultural pursuits common in the Riverina at that time and projected an image of Australia and Australians that would later change rapidly.

The writer Joseph Furphy worked as a bullocky for 10 years in the area around Hay from 1872. Later, using the pen name Tom Collins, Furphy wrote Such Is Life set in the Riverina during the drought and depression of the 1890s and drawing on his experiences as a bullocky. Although a slow seller, the novel was described as "fitted to become an Australian classic" by A.G. Stephens, the literary critic of The Bulletin.

Published in 1921, Around the Boree Log and Other Verses was written by Patrick Joseph Hartigan, under the pen name John O'Brien. A Roman Catholic priest, after early stints at Thurgoona and Berrigan, in 1917 Hartigan was appointed as the parish priest of Narrandera where he stayed until 1944. His poems recorded the everyday lives and mateship of the people of the Riverina. His friend and well-known poet C. J. Dennis hailed them in The Bulletin as in 'the direct Lawson-Paterson line mainly—unaffected talk about Australians, much as they would naturally talk about themselves'. Around the Boree Log ran to five editions and 18,000 copies by 1926.

The artist and key member of the Heidelberg School, Tom Roberts spent some time on a sheep station near Brocklesby prior to and during the painting of his most celebrated artwork, Shearing the Rams. The painting was criticised in its time for the depiction of strong manual labour rather than the common "high art" themes of the day. It is seen now as reflecting Australia's largest industry at the time and the work of ordinary Australians. The painting is now in the collection of the National Gallery of Victoria.

Scots of the Riverina, a poem written by one of Australia's most renowned writers, Henry Lawson, is set in Gundagai. The poem describes a father's anger at his son's desertion at harvest time and later his grief when the son dies in battle in World War I. Hay and Hell and Booligal, written by Banjo Paterson, is a humorous take on life on the flat western Riverina plan.

Today, major cultural institutions in the Riverina include the Museum of the Riverina, the Riverina Theatre Company and the Wagga Wagga Art Gallery (incorporating the National Art Glass Gallery), all located in the regional centre of Wagga Wagga with outreach to the smaller towns. Many regional towns including Hay, Deniliquin and Gundagai house museums of significant regional interest. The HotHouse Theatre group, based in Albury takes live theatre to small towns throughout the Riverina. The tiny town of Morundah holds an annual night at the opera, hosting performances by OzOpera and the Victorian Opera. Popular music groups from the Riverina include one of Australia's most distinctive and popular bands of the '90s and 2000s, Spiderbait who come from the southern Riverina town of Finley. The Riverina is currently home to two major regional LQBTQIA+ festivals, the Hay Mardi Gras established in 2018 and the Wagga Mardi Gras established in 2019.
