= Jindera =

- Town
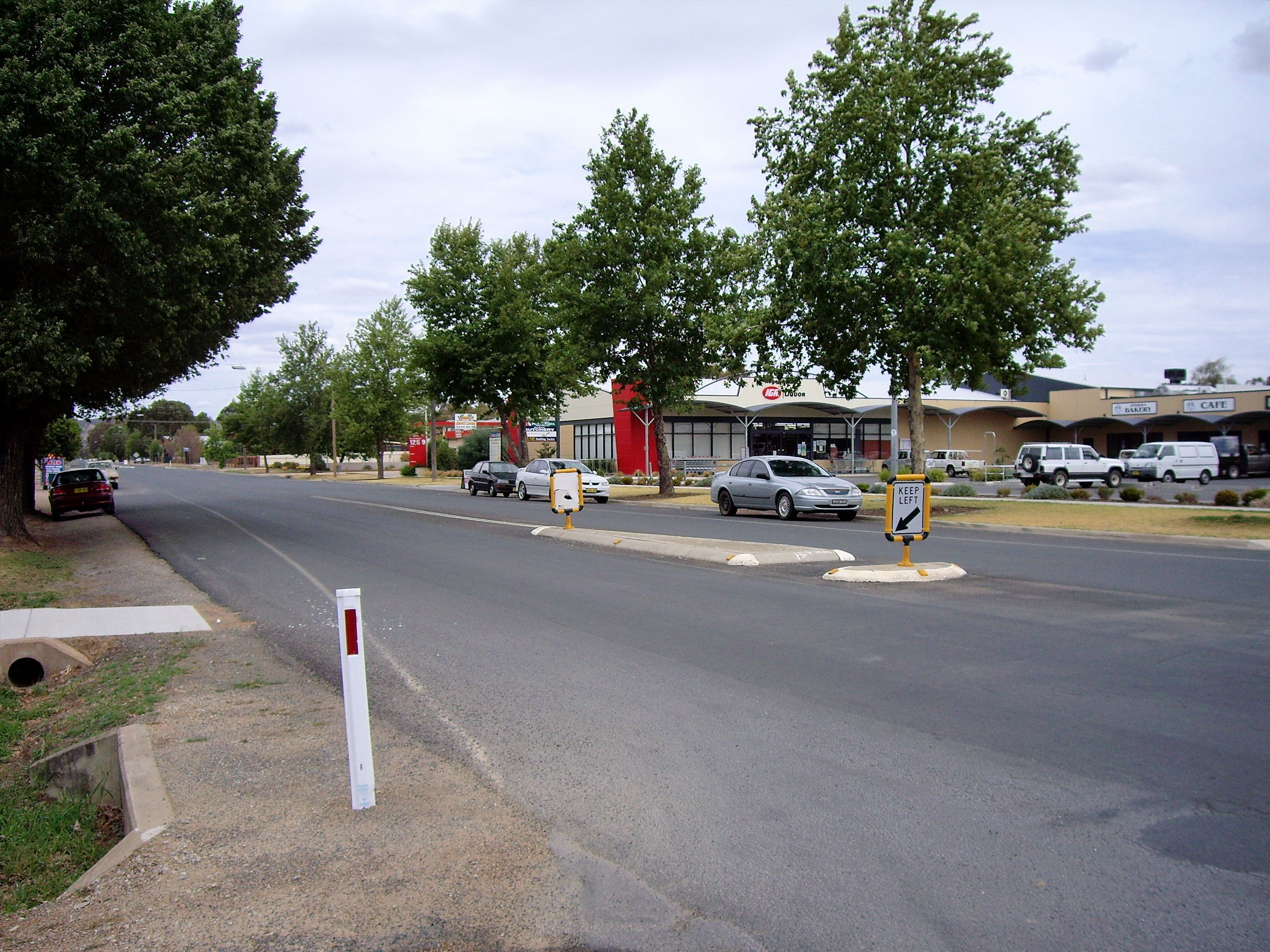
- Jindera – looking south in the main street

- Coordinates: 35°57′0″S 146°54′0″E
- Country: Australia
- State: New South Wales
- LGA: Greater Hume Shire
- Location: 457 km (284 mi) SW of Sydney; 268 km (167 mi) NE of Melbourne; 15 km (9.3 mi) NW of Albury

Government
  - State electorate: Albury
  - Federal division: Farrer
- Elevation: 304 m (997 ft)

Population
  - Total: 2,222 (2016 census)
- Postcode: 2642
- County: Goulburn

Jindera /ˈdʒɪndərə/ is a small town in the South West Slopes section of the Riverina region of New South Wales, Australia. The town is situated in the Greater Hume Shire local government area, 15 kilometres (9.3 mi) north of the regional centre of Albury. At the 2016 census, Jindera had a population of 2,222 residents.

Jindera's chief attraction is Jindera Pioneer Museum, which is contained within an old store and home that belonged to the pioneering Wagner family. The "store" is stocked with authentic goods of the 19th century, while the living area at the rear is furnished in the original style of the era.

== History ==
Hamilton Hume and William Hovell were two early explorers who passed through the area, travelling from Sydney to Geelong in 1824. The township was originally known as "Dight's Forest", after John Dight who was a relative of Hamilton Hume. Although likely to be Aboriginal, the origin of the place name "Jindera" is now obscure.

During the nineteenth century Jindera saw a substantial population of German Australians who had migrated to the Riverina in the 1860s, principally from South Australia.

Dight's Forest Post Office opened on 1 January 1870 and was renamed Jindera in 1885.

In 1900, Jindera, Thurgoona and Black Range Australian rules football club's played in the Swain Trophy competition.

== Education ==
St John's Lutheran School is a coeducational independent school located in Jindera that caters for preschool through to Year 6., and is a part of Lutheran Education Australia, a network of schools and early childhood centres designed to promote and support Lutheran education across Australia. St John's was established in 1868 when the Lutheran pioneers trekked from South Australia to Jindera. The first school was a single log cabin classroom attached to Pastor J.F. Goessling's house. The school's current location) was built in 1924.

Jindera Public School moved to its current premises in 1992.

In 2009, the St Mary MacKillop College, Albury opened in the grounds of St Mary's Church, Jindera.

== Climate ==
Climate data for Jindera post office (Lat: 35.95° S Lon: 146.89° E) (precipitation normals 1961-1990)
Month	Jan	Feb	Mar	Apr	May	Jun	Jul	Aug	Sep	Oct	Nov	Dec	Year
Average precipitation mm (inches)	45.3 (1.78)	32.8 (1.29)	41.2 (1.62)	54.2 (2.13)	73.7 (2.90)	57.9 (2.28)	80.7 (3.18)	81.4 (3.20)	65.5 (2.58)	67.1 (2.64)	43.8 (1.72)	46.8 (1.84)	690.4 (27.16)
Source: Bureau of Meteorology

== Gallery ==
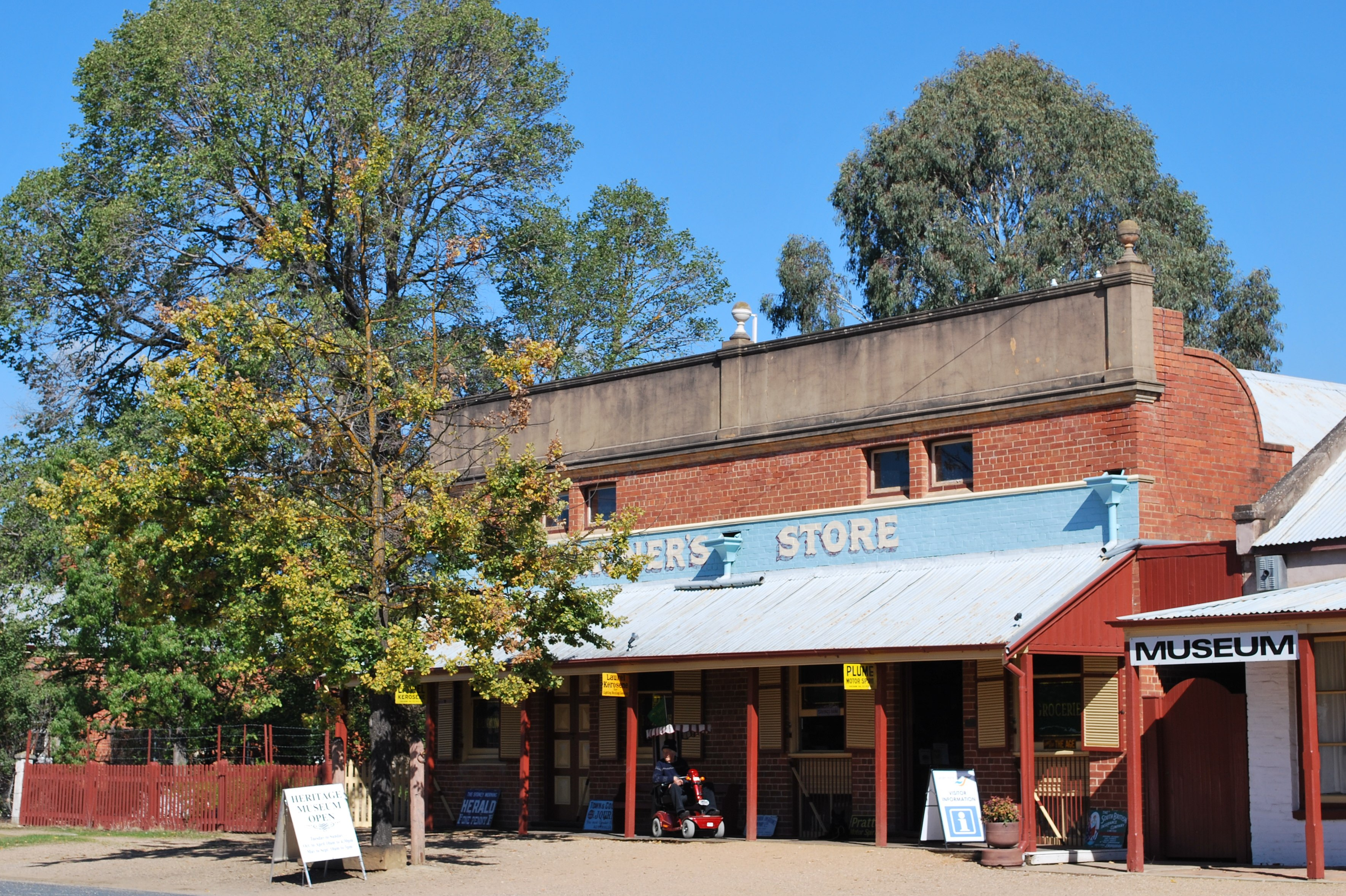
Jindera Pioneer Museum

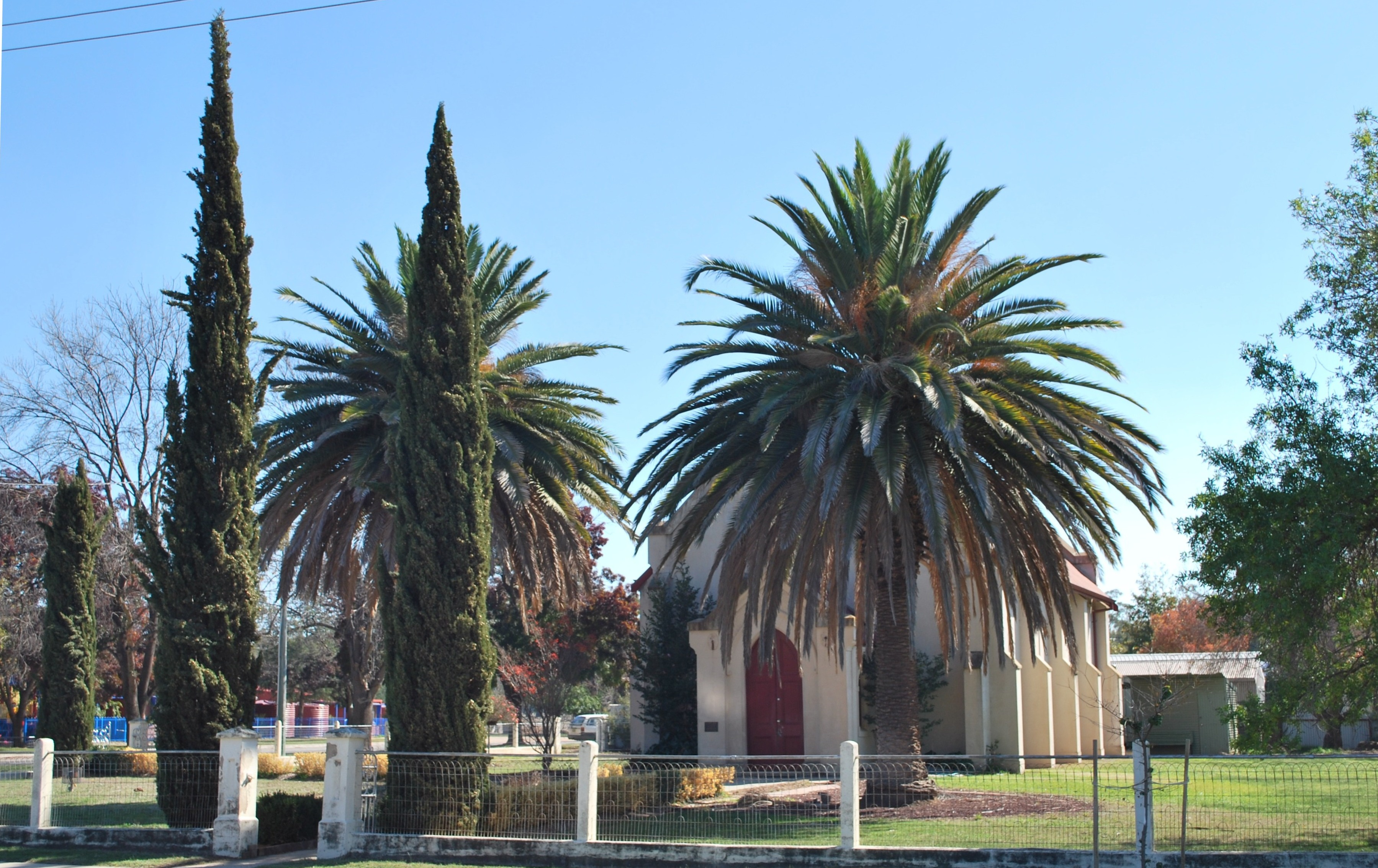
Lutheran chapel

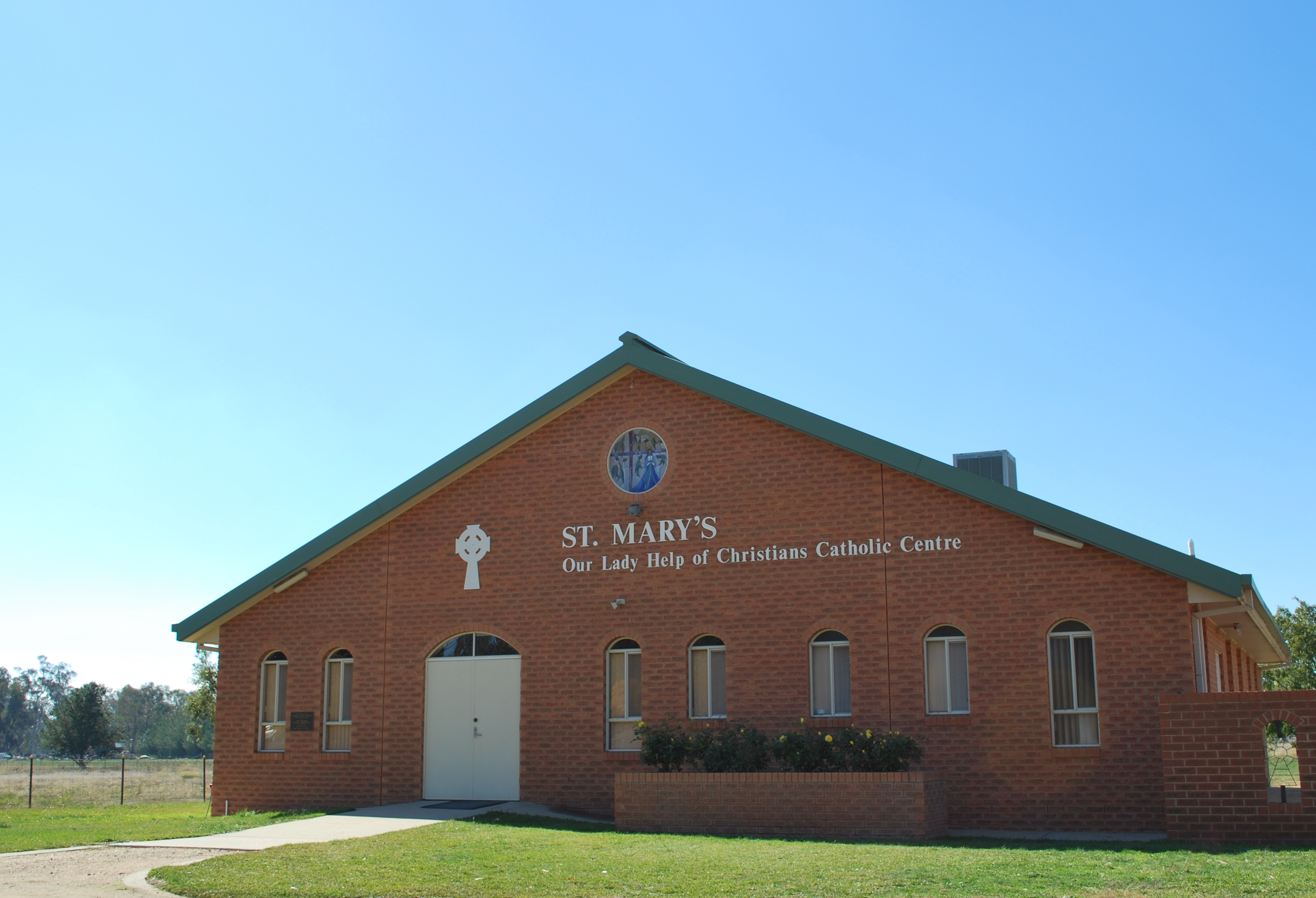
Our Lady Help of Christians church
