= Yuluma, New South Wales =

Yuluma
- Town
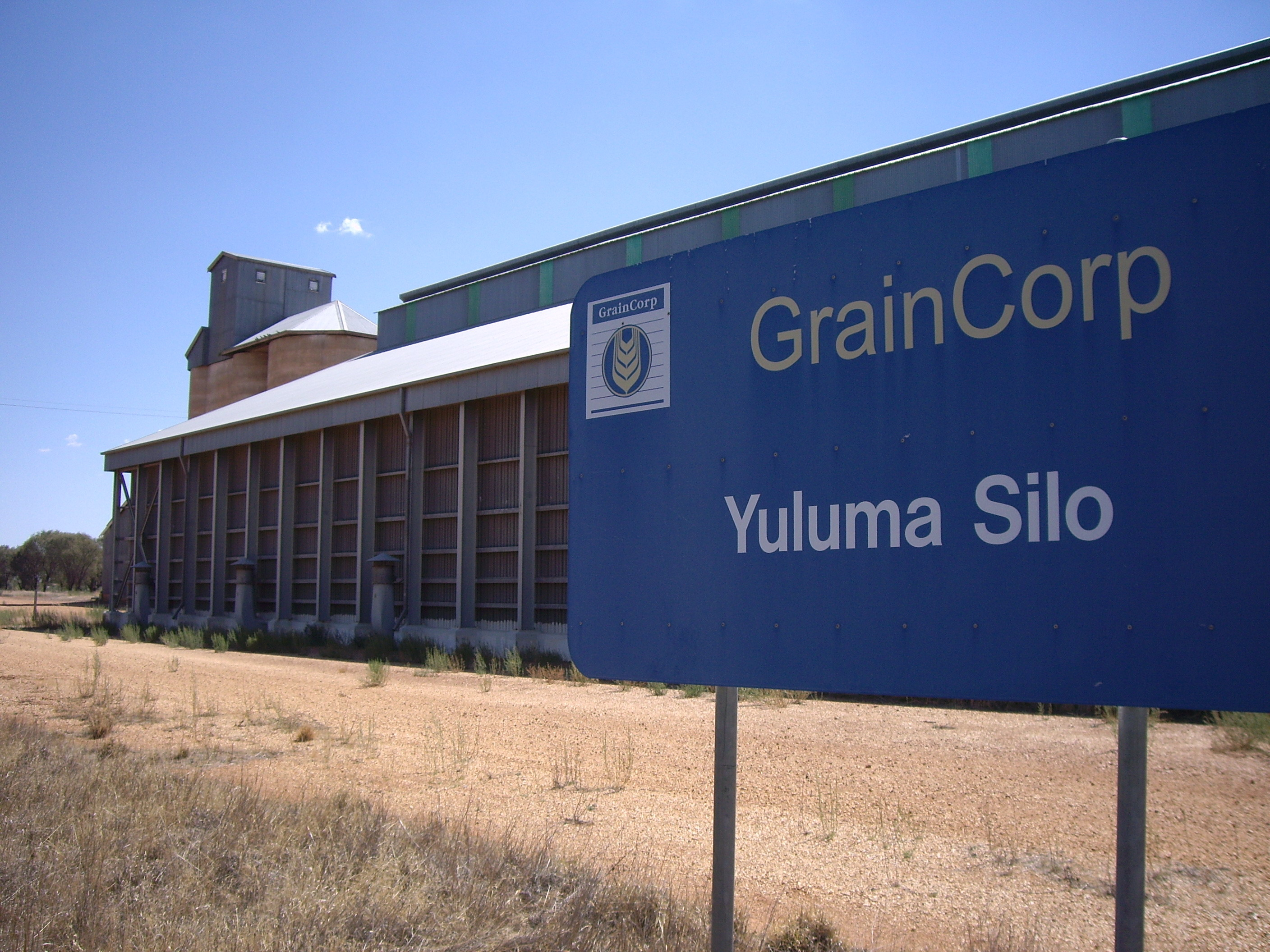
- Yuluma Silo

- Coordinates: 35°09′55″S 146°29′31″E
- Country: Australia
- State: New South Wales
- LGA: Federation Council
- Location: 7 km (4.3 mi) from Boree Creek; 29 km (18 mi) from Urana

Government
  - State electorate: Wagga Wagga
- Elevation: 149 m (489 ft)
- Postcode: 2645
- County: Urana

Yuluma is a rural community in the central part of the Riverina and a railway station on The Rock–Oaklands Railway line. The station is situated about 616 rail kilometres from Sydney. It is situated by road, about 7 kilometres (4.3 mi) south west of Boree Creek and 29 kilometres (18 mi) north east of Urana. The railway station was in operation between 1911 and 1975.

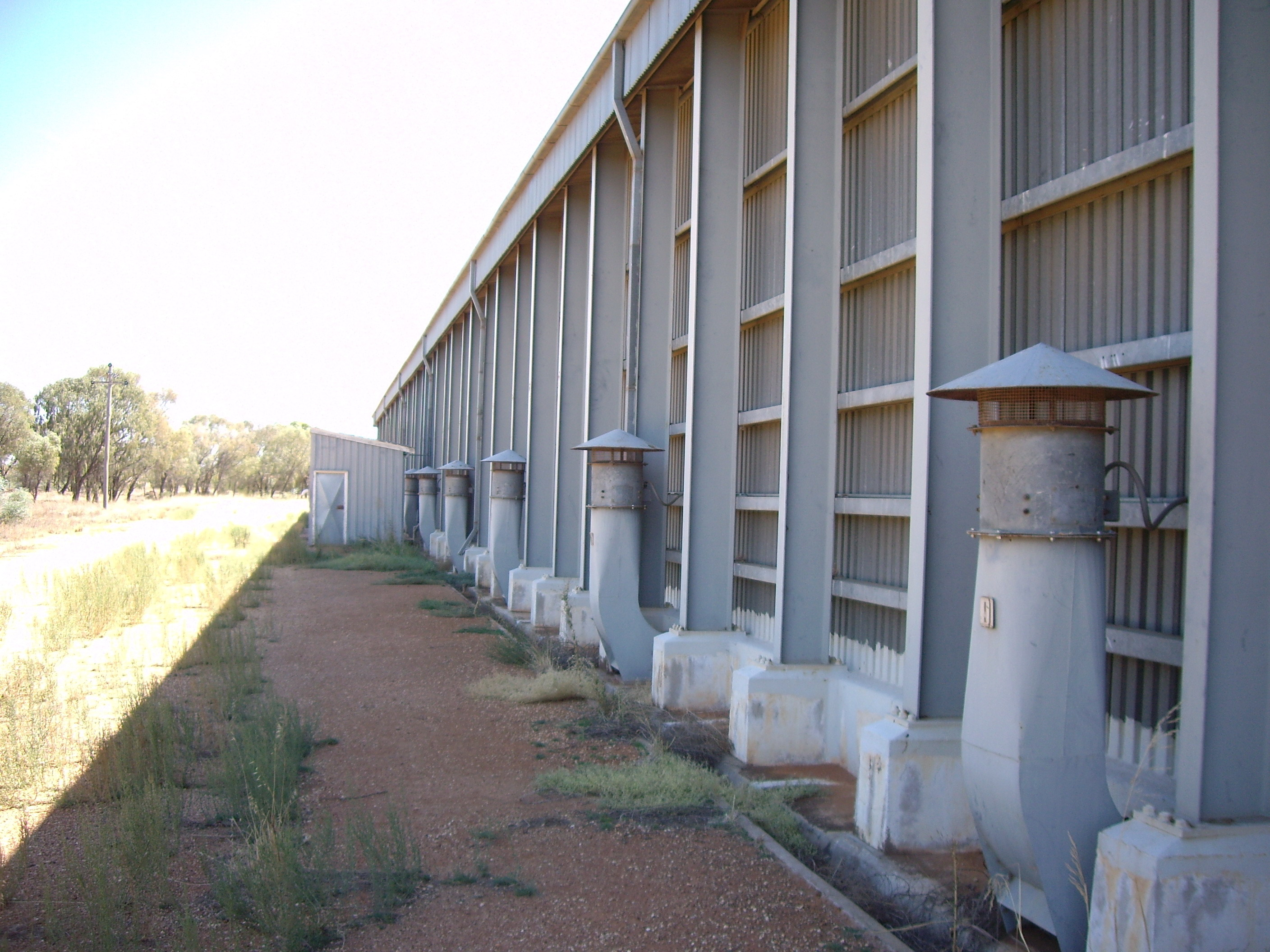
Silo – not currently in use

Preceding station	Former services	Following station
Cullivel towards Oaklands	Oaklands Line	Boree Creek towards The Rock
