= Napier, New South Wales =

Coordinates: 35°14′55″S 146°46′04″E

Napier is a locality in the Riverina district of New South Wales, Australia and also a civil parish of Buccleuch County, New South Wales.

Napier was the site of a now-closed railway station between 1911 and 1967 on the Oaklands railway line. No trace of the station now remains.

Preceding station	Former services	Following station
Lockhart towards Oaklands	Oaklands Line	Milbrulong towards The Rock

The Napier Football Club (Australian Rules Football) were the premiers of the Lockhart & District Football Association in 1911.
