= Long Park, New South Wales =

Town in New South Wales, Australia

Coordinates: 35°08′S 146°39′E

Long Park is a locality in the Riverina district of New South Wales, Australia. It was the site of a now-closed railway station between 1910 and 1975 on the Oaklands railway line. The railway remains open; however the siding and station have been removed and little trace remains.

Preceding station	Former services	Following station
Boree Creek towards Oaklands	Oaklands Line	Lockhart towards The Rock
