= Cullivel =

- Town
- Coordinates: 35°16′S 146°23′E
- Country: Australia
- State: New South Wales
- LGA: Lockhart Shire

Government
  - State electorate: Albury
  - Federal division: Farrer
- Postcode: 2645
- County: Urana

Cullivel is a locality in the Riverina district of New South Wales, Australia. It was the site of a now-closed railway station between 1911 and 1975 on the Oaklands railway line. A wheat silo remains, and Cullivel State Forest lies to the north-west.

== Cullivel railway station ==
Cullivel railway station was located about 632 kilometres (393 mi) by rail from Sydney.

Preceding station	Former services	Following station
Urana towards Oaklands	Oaklands Line	Yuluma towards The Rock
