= Uranagong, New South Wales =

Coordinates: 35°24′S 146°14′E

Uranagong is a locality in the Riverina district of New South Wales, Australia. It was the site of a now-closed railway station and siding between 1912 and 1950 on the Oaklands railway line. Although the disused rail-track is in place, no trace of the former station remains.

Preceding station	Former services	Following station
Coorabin towards Oaklands	Oaklands Line	Urana towards The Rock
