= Coorabin =

Coordinates: 35°28′S 146°13′E

- Country: Australia
- State: New South Wales
- LGA: Federation Council

Government
  - State electorate: Albury
  - Federal division: Farrer
- Postcode: 2646
- County: Urana

Coorabin is a locality in the Riverina district of New South Wales, Australia. It was the site of a now-closed railway station between 1912 and 1975 on the Oaklands railway line.

== Coorabin railway station ==
Preceding station	Former services	Following station
Oaklands Terminus	Oaklands Line	Uranagong towards The Rock
