= Boree Creek =

- Town
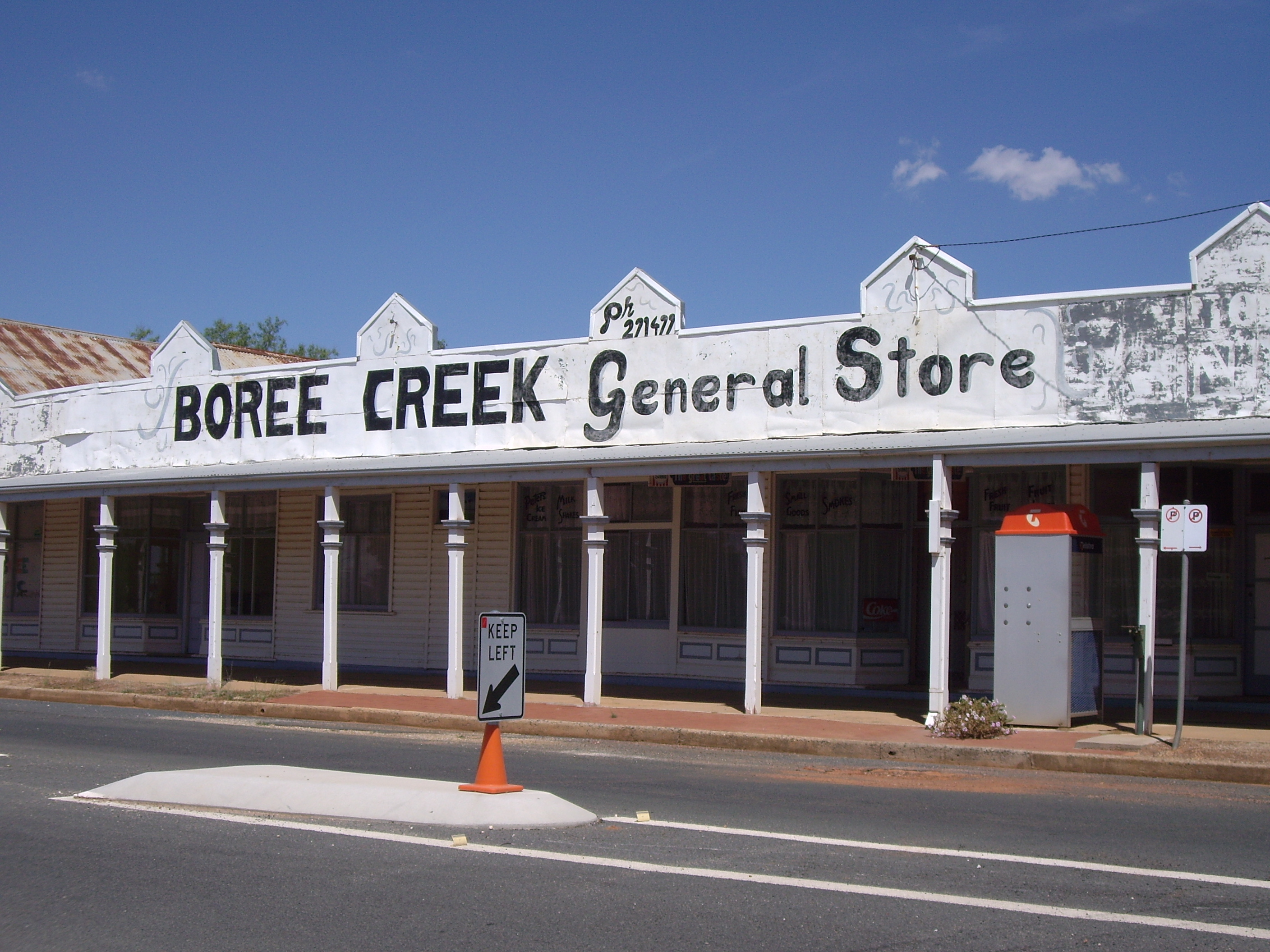
- Boree Creek General Store

- Coordinates: 35°06′30″S 146°36′35″E
- Country: Australia
- State: New South Wales
- LGA: Federation Council
- Location: 541 km (336 mi) from Sydney; 85 km (53 mi) from Wagga Wagga; 15 km (9.3 mi) from Kywong; 7 km (4.3 mi) from Yuluma
- Established: 1910

Government
  - State electorate: Murray
  - Federal divisions: Farrer; Riverina

Population
  - Total: 64 (2016 census)
- Postcode: 2652
- County: Urana

Boree Creek /bɒˈriː/ is a town in the Riverina district of New South Wales, Australia. The town is located 539 kilometres (335 mi) south west of the state capital, Sydney and 82 kilometres (51 mi) west of the regional centre, Wagga Wagga. Boree Creek is situated in the Federation Council local government area but is closer to the town of Lockhart. At the 2016 census, Boree Creek had a population of 64.

Like many of the smaller towns of the Riverina, it has seen its population decline in recent years. Boree Creek is most famous for being the home town of former deputy prime minister Tim Fischer. At times when Fischer was acting as prime minister, his property at Boree Creek became the "seat of power" of Australia.

== History ==
Boree Creek Post Office opened on 1 August 1884 (it was closed between 1906 and 1911).

Boree Creek is the last operating section of the mostly closed railway to Oaklands. Seasonal grain trains service the silos, the station closed to passenger services in 1975 and little trace remains.

== Sports and recreation ==
The Boree Creek Football Club was an Australian Rules Football club established on Saturday 20th March 1886 and "The Creekers" disbanded in 1982, after one final season in the Riverina District Football League. The club played in the Riverina & DFL – Divisions Two competition in 1983, 1984.

In 1938 the club colours were black and white.

In 1940, 16 players from the Boree Creek FC enlisted for active duty in World War Two and thus, the club therefore pulled out of The Rock & District Football Assication in late June, 1940. The club reformed in 1946 after WW2 and joined the Milbrulong Football League.

Football Premierships

- Greengunyah Football Association
  - 1906,
- Lockhart & District Football Association
  - 1907 1909 (won all games, bar one, which was drawn), 1912
- Faithful & District Football Association
  - 1926, 1927, 1932, 1937, 1938, 1939.
- Peter Dawson Cup
  - 1929
- Central Riverina Football League
  - 1953

Runners-up

- Lockhart & District Football Association
  - 1905
- Faithful & District Football Association
  - 1928, 1933, 1936

Boree Creek Races

In 1913 the Boree Creek Amateur Picnic Race Club held their first race meeting on the private property of Mr Archibald Moffat, situated just behind the town's business centre, with the meeting making a profit of £50. It appears the annual race meeting went from 1913 to 1929.

Boree Creek Cricket Club

The Boree Cricket Club was established in the early 1900s, with an annual ball taking place in 1905 and appeared to be active up until the early 1950s.

Boree Creek Cycling Club

The Boree Creek Cycling Club was formed in 1936 but appears to have operated for two years only.

== Gallery ==
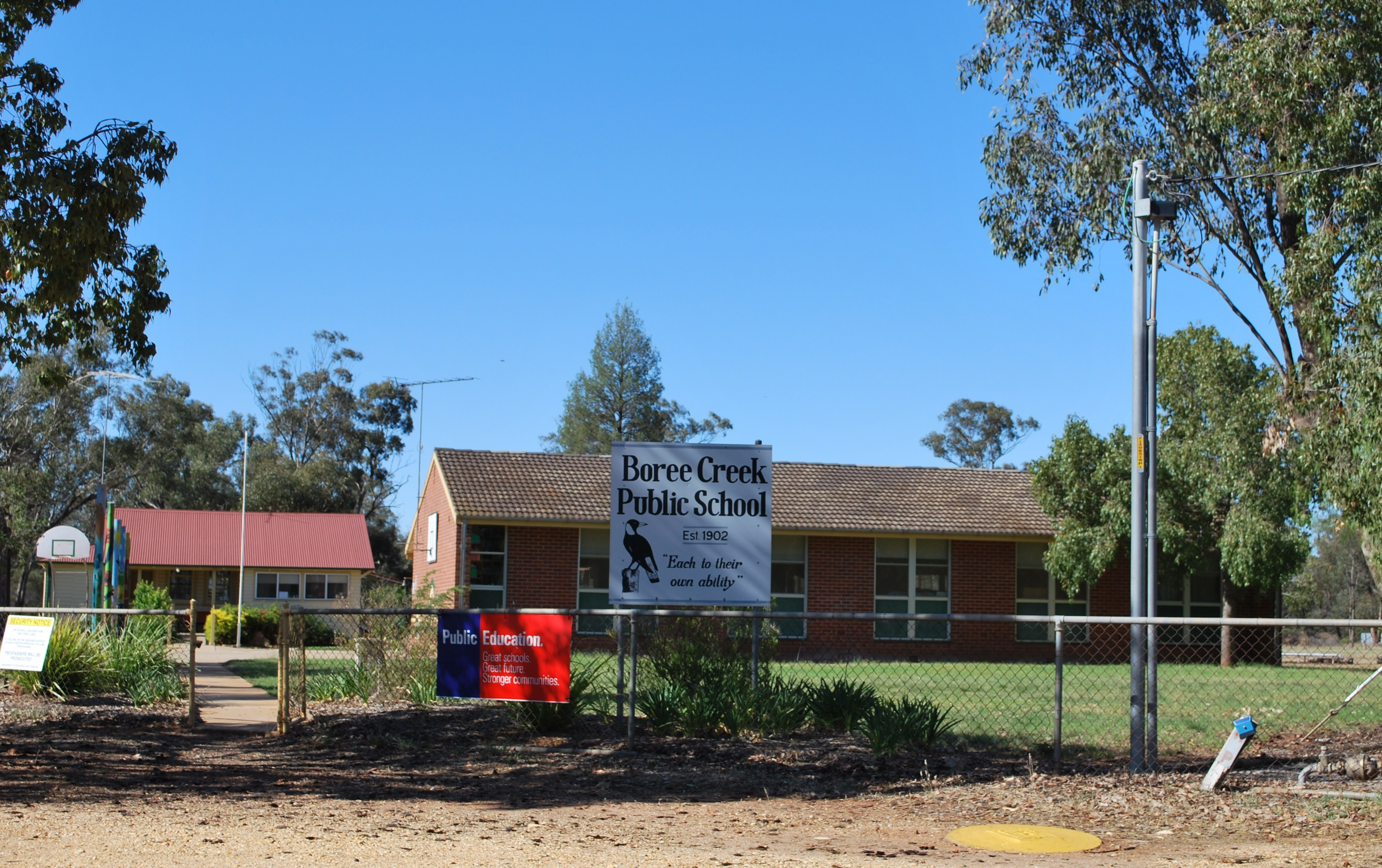
Boree Creek Public School

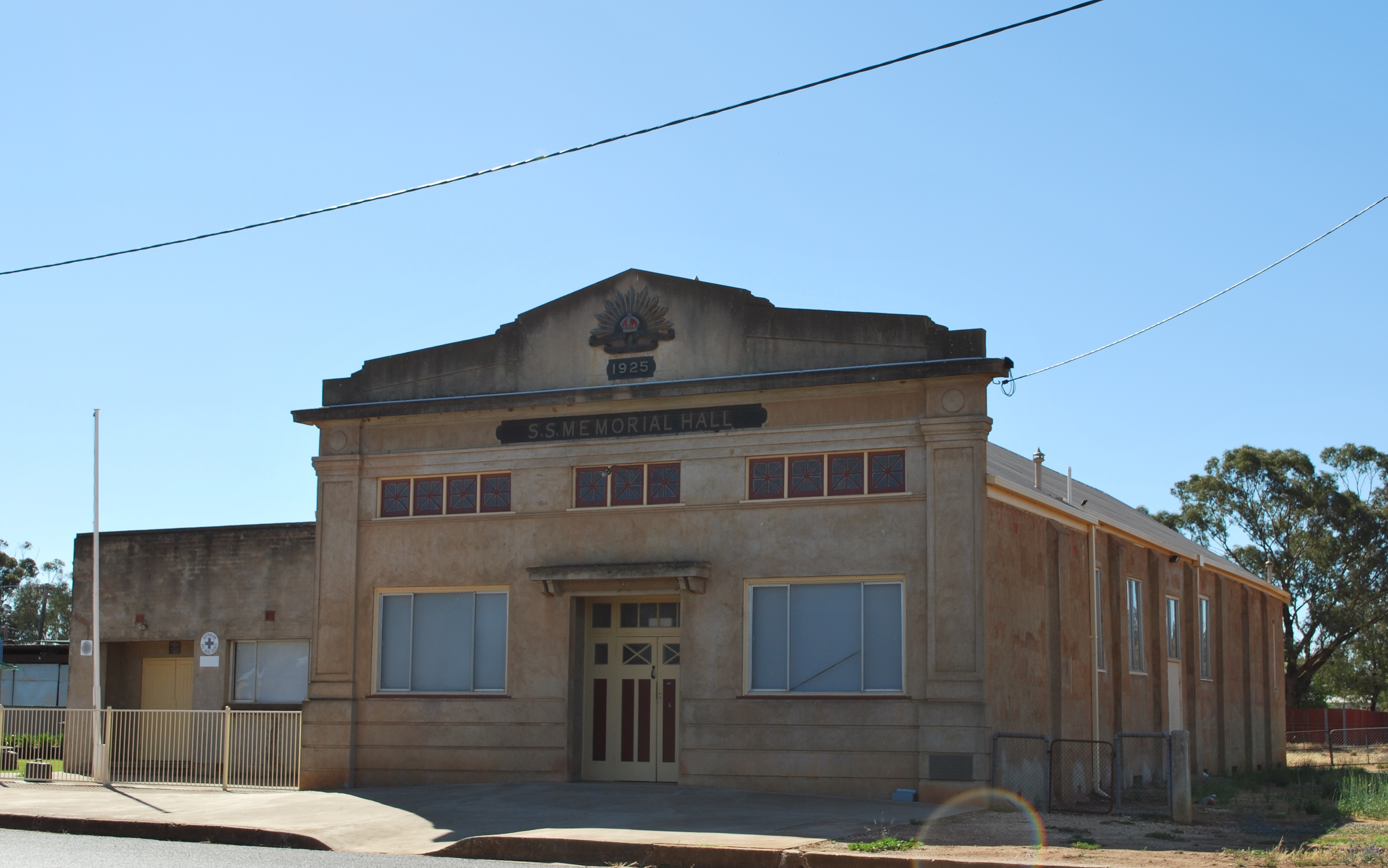
Soldiers' Memorial Hall

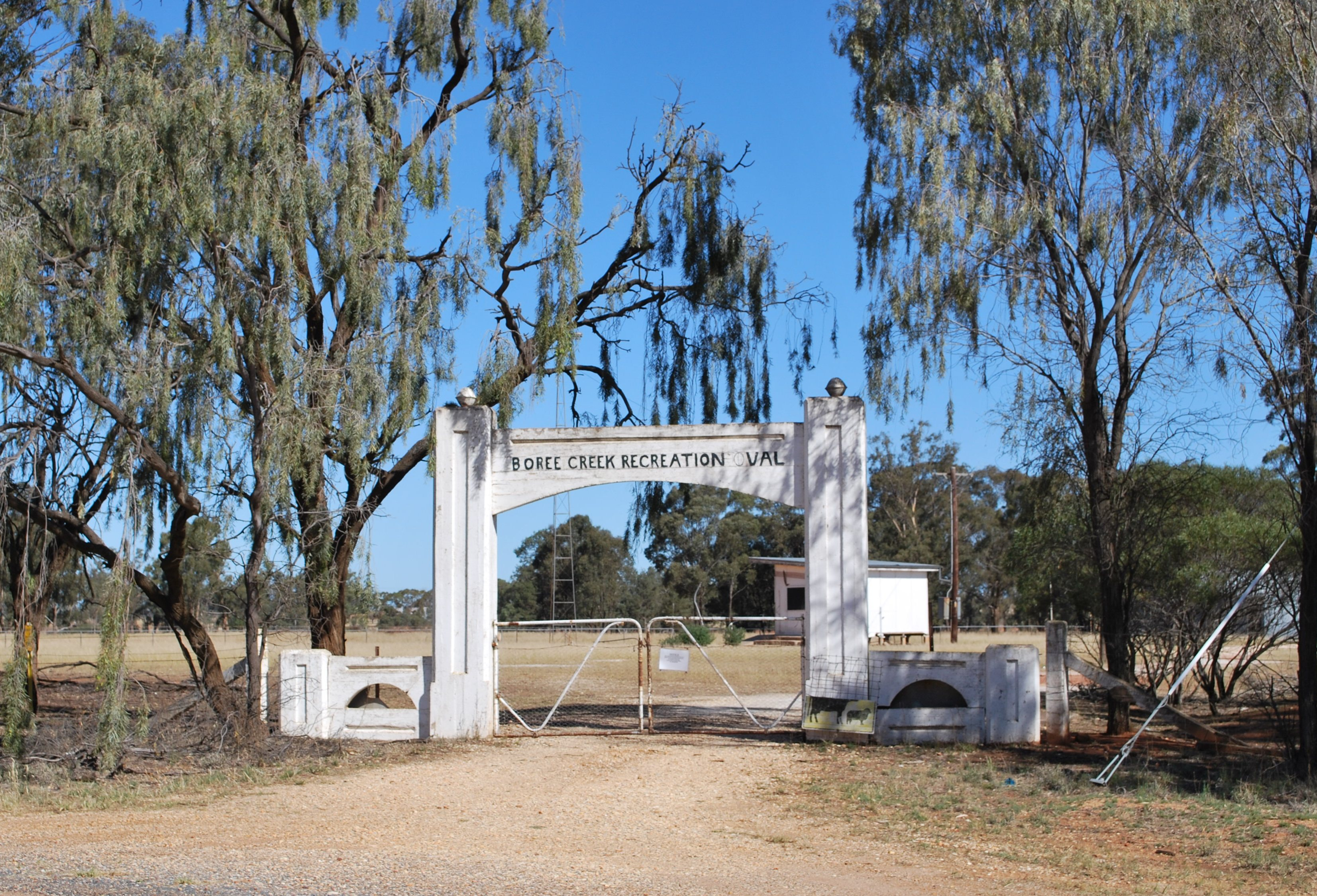
Gates of the Recreation Oval

== See also ==
- Oaklands railway line, New South Wales

Preceding station	Former services	Following station
Yuluma towards Oaklands	Oaklands Line	Long Park towards The Rock
