= Oaklands railway line =

Oaklands railway line may refer to:

- Oaklands railway line, New South Wales, Australia
- Oaklands railway line, Victoria, Australia
