= Nyora, New South Wales =

Nyora
- Town
- Coordinates: 35°31′58″S 145°59′05″E
- Country: Australia
- State: New South Wales
- LGA: Murrumbidgee Council
- Location: 21 km (13 mi) from Oaklands; 27 km (17 mi) from Berrigan

Government
  - State electorate: Albury
  - Federal division: Farrer

Population
  - Total: 18 (SAL 2021)
- Postcode: 2646
- County: Urana

Nyora is a rural locality in the central south part of the Riverina and the previous site of a public school. It is situated by road, about 21 kilometres west of Oaklands and 27 kilometres north east of Berrigan.
