= The Lockhart Review and Oaklands Advertiser =

The Lockhart Review and Oaklands Advertiser also published as Lockhart Review and Boree Chronicle, The Lockhart Review and Lockhart Review, was a weekly English language newspaper published in Lockhart, New South Wales, Australia.

Cover page of 22 November 1910 issue of The Lockhart Review

== Newspaper history ==
The newspaper was established on 4 July 1908 by Arthur Clague Cowin, who emigrated from the Isle of Man to Australia in 1902. Cowin had arrived in the nearby town of Urana in 1906 in response to the offer of £100 from residents to start up a newspaper. He arrived a day late but then was advised by some locals he was staying with in Murrumburrah to start up a newspaper in Lockhart instead.

When in 1920, the Lockhart Leader had closed down, Cowin absorbed the business, eventually closing it down in 1924. On 14 January 1936, the newspaper dropped its subtitle "and Oaklands Advertiser" which was transferred to the neighbouring newspaper Urana Shire Advocate managed by Cowin's son A. G. (George) Cowin. Arthur Cowin retired in 1943, and ownership of the Review passed to George who absorbed The Urana Shire Advocate into The Lockhart Review on 4 July 1950.

George Cowin closed down The Lockhart Review on 6 July 1954 to W.A. (Arthur) Gray before it was sold again to Riverina Newspapers Pty Ltd in 1959. The last issue was published on 22 November 1967.

== Digitisation ==
The paper has been digitised as part of the Australian Newspapers Digitisation Program of the National Library of Australia.

== See also ==
- List of newspapers in Australia
- List of newspapers in New South Wales
