= Carrodus =

Carrodus is a surname. Notable people with the surname include:

- Frank Carrodus (born 1949), English footballer
- John Tiplady Carrodus (1836–1895), English violinist
- Joseph Carrodus (1885–1961), Australian public servant
- Trevor Carrodus (born 1952), Australian rules footballer
