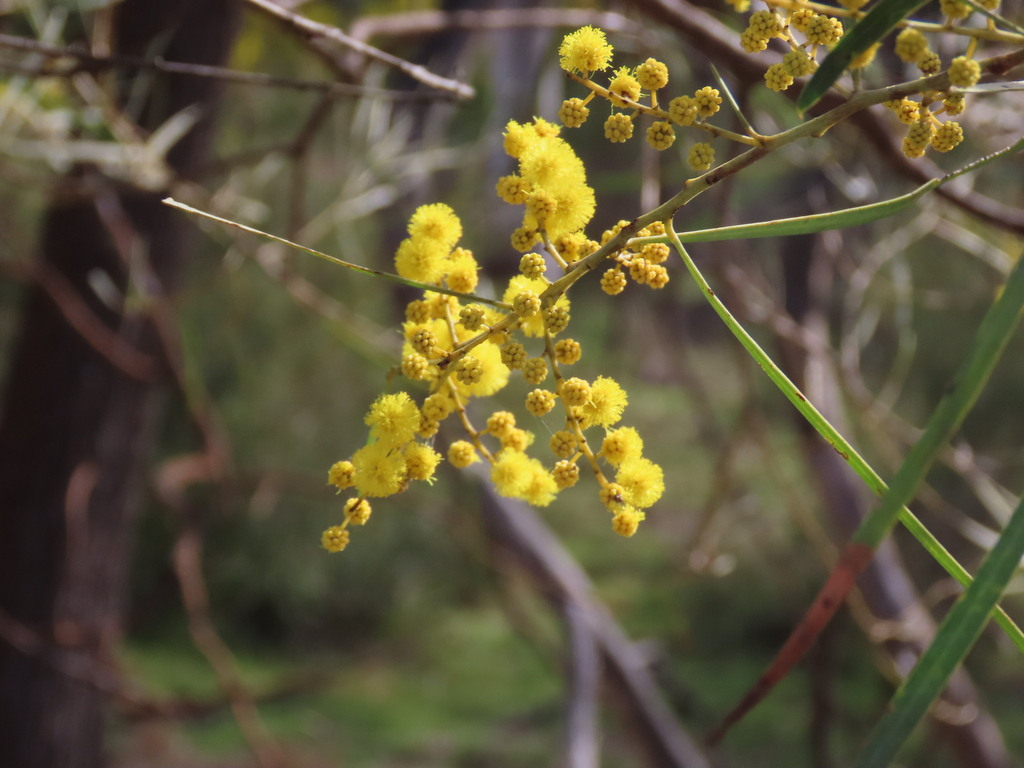

Scientific classification
- Kingdom: Plantae
- Clade: Embryophytes
- Clade: Tracheophytes
- Clade: Angiosperms
- Clade: Eudicots
- Clade: Rosids
- Order: Fabales
- Family: Fabaceae
- Subfamily: Caesalpinioideae
- Clade: Mimosoid clade
- Genus: Acacia
- Species: A. linearifolia

Binomial name
- Acacia linearifolia A.Cunn. ex Maiden & Blakely

Synonyms
- List: Acacia murrumboensis Maiden & Blakely; Racosperma linearifolium (A.Cunn. ex Maiden & Blakely) Pedley; Acacia adunca auct. non A.Cunn. ex G.Don: Maiden, J.H. (February 1912), The Forest Flora of New South Wales 5(46) p.p.

= Acacia linearifolia =

Stringybark wattle

Species of legume

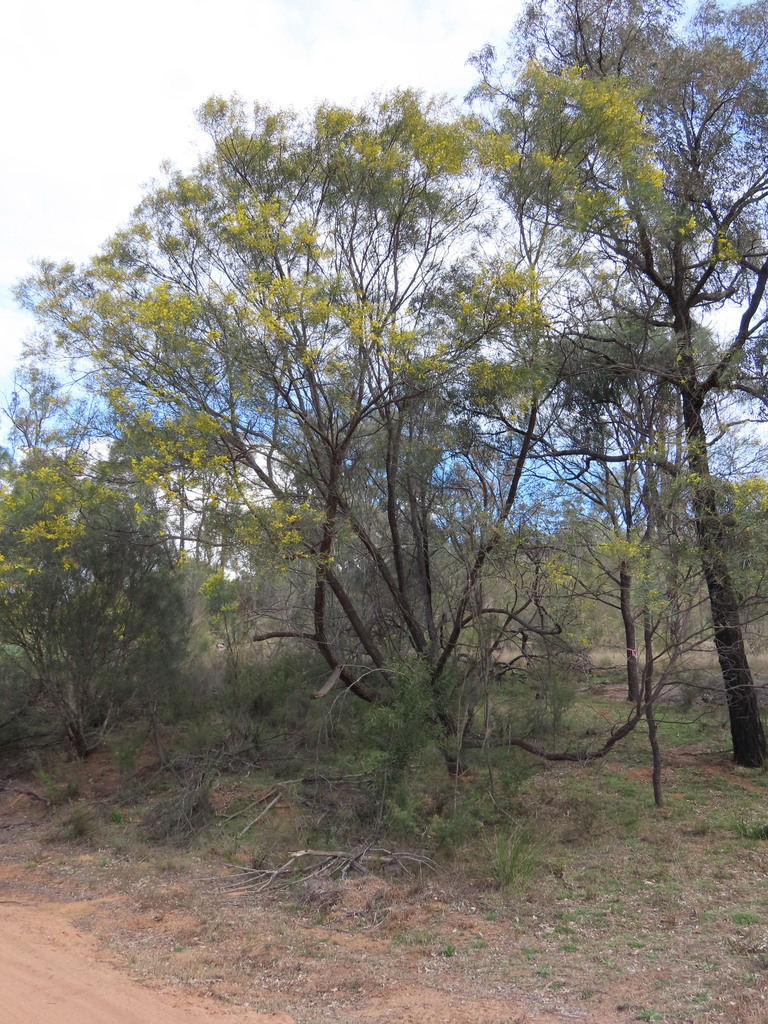
Habit near Merriwa

Acacia linearifolia, commonly known as stringybark wattle or narrow-leaved wattle, is a species of flowering plant in the family Fabaceae and is endemic to eastern continental Australia. It is an erect, spreading shrub or tree with rough bark near the base, thin, narrowly linear, glabrous phyllodes with a prominent midrib, spherical heads of golden yellow flowers, and firmly papery to thinly leathery pods, shallowly constricted between the seeds.

== Description ==
Acacia linearifolia is an erect or spreading shrub or tree that typically grows to a height of up to 10 m (33 ft) and has smooth grey to grey-brown bark, often corrugated or fissured near the base. The branchlets are glabrous and dark reddish. The phyllodes are narrowly linear, 60–140 mm (2.4–5.5 in) long, 2–5 mm (0.079–0.197 in) wide, thin, glabrous with a prominent midrib and a curved to hooked tip on the end. The flowers are borne in spherical heads in racemes 25–60 mm (0.98–2.36 in) long on peduncles 2–4 mm (0.079–0.157 in) long, each head with 20 to 30 golden yellow flowers. Flowering occurs from August to October, and the pods are up to about 120 mm (4.7 in) long, 5–75 mm (0.20–2.95 in) wide, firmly papery to thinly leathery, glabrous and reddish brown. The seeds are oblong, 5–6 mm (0.20–0.24 in) long, shallowly constricted between the seeds and shiny black with a club-shaped aril.

== Taxonomy ==
Acacia linearifolia was first formally described in 1927 by Joseph Maiden and William Blakely from an unpublished description by Allan Cunningham of a specimen collected in the Blue Mountains. Maiden and Blakely noted "The locality is evidently a mistake, as we know of no such Acacia occurring on the Blue Mountains".

== Distribution and habitat ==
Narrow-leaved wattle mainly occurs from near Scone and Denman and west to Gulgong and Dunedoo with outliers at Binalong, Wagga Wagga and The Rock. There is also a small population near Burrowye in Victoria, near the New South Wales border. It often grows in sand on the lower slopes to exposed, rocky sites on sandstone hills in forest and woodland.

== See also ==
- List of Acacia species
