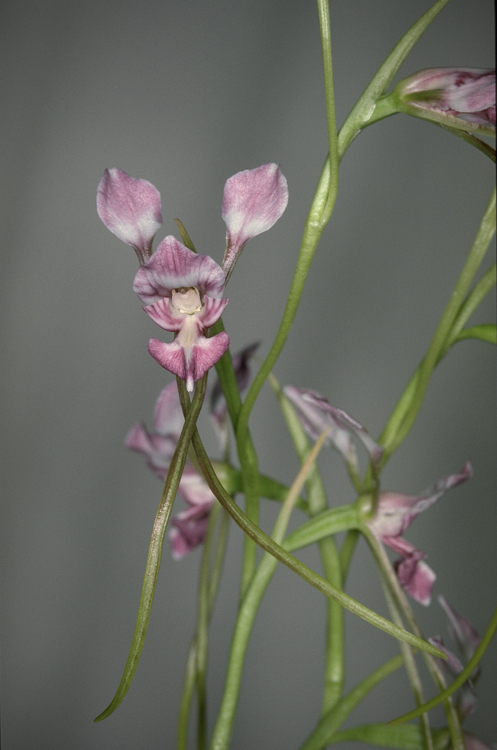
- Near Urana

Scientific classification
- Kingdom: Plantae
- Clade: Embryophytes
- Clade: Tracheophytes
- Clade: Angiosperms
- Clade: Monocots
- Order: Asparagales
- Family: Orchidaceae
- Subfamily: Orchidoideae
- Tribe: Diurideae
- Genus: Diuris
- Species: D. callitrophila

Binomial name
- Diuris callitrophila D.L.Jones

= Diuris callitrophila =

Oaklands doubletail

Species of orchid

Diuris callitrophila, commonly known as the Oaklands doubletail or Oaklands diuris, is a species of orchid which is endemic to a small part of southern New South Wales. It has two or three leaves and up to nine whitish and mauve flowers with darker markings and unusually long lateral sepals.

== Description ==
Diuris callitrophila is a tuberous, perennial herb with two or three leaves 150–350 mm (6–10 in) long, 5–9 mm (0.2–0.4 in) wide and folded lengthwise. Between three and nine white, purple or mauve flowers with darker markings, 25–35 mm (0.98–1.4 in) wide are borne on a flowering stem 300–500 mm (10–20 in) tall. The dorsal sepal is more or less erect, 10–20 mm (0.4–0.8 in) long and 8–12 mm (0.3–0.5 in) wide. The lateral sepals are 40–120 mm (2–5 in) long, 2–4 mm (0.08–0.2 in) wide and turned downwards. The petals are ear-like and held erect above the rest of the flower, with an elliptic blade 6–16 mm (0.2–0.6 in) long and 6–10 mm (0.2–0.4 in) wide. The petals have a dark-coloured stalk 3–7 mm (0.12–0.28 in) long that gradually expands towards the blade. The labellum is 10–15 mm (0.4–0.6 in) long and has three lobes. The centre lobe is fan-shaped, 10–15 mm (0.4–0.6 in) long and 8–15 mm (0.3–0.6 in) wide and the side lobes are 3–6 mm (0.1–0.2 in) long and 1–3 mm (0.04–0.1 in) wide. There are two broad callus ridges 5–6 mm (0.20–0.24 in) long at the base of the mid-line of the labellum. Flowering occurs in November and December.

== Taxonomy and naming ==
Diuris callitrophila was first formally described in 2003 by David Jones from a specimen collected near Oaklands and the description was published in The Orchadian.

== Distribution and habitat ==
The Oaklands doubletail is only known from a few locations between Oaklands and Urana where it grows in small groups in grassy places in Callitris woodland.

== Conservation ==
Diuris callitrophila is classed as "endangered" under the New South Wales Threatened Species Conservation Act. The main threats to the species are its restricted distribution and small population, weed invasion, grazing and inappropriate fire regimes. Steps are being taken to conserve the species by collecting the seed and its associated fungus, growing the orchid and reintroducing it to its natural habitat.
