= Lockhart, New South Wales =

Lockhart New South Wales
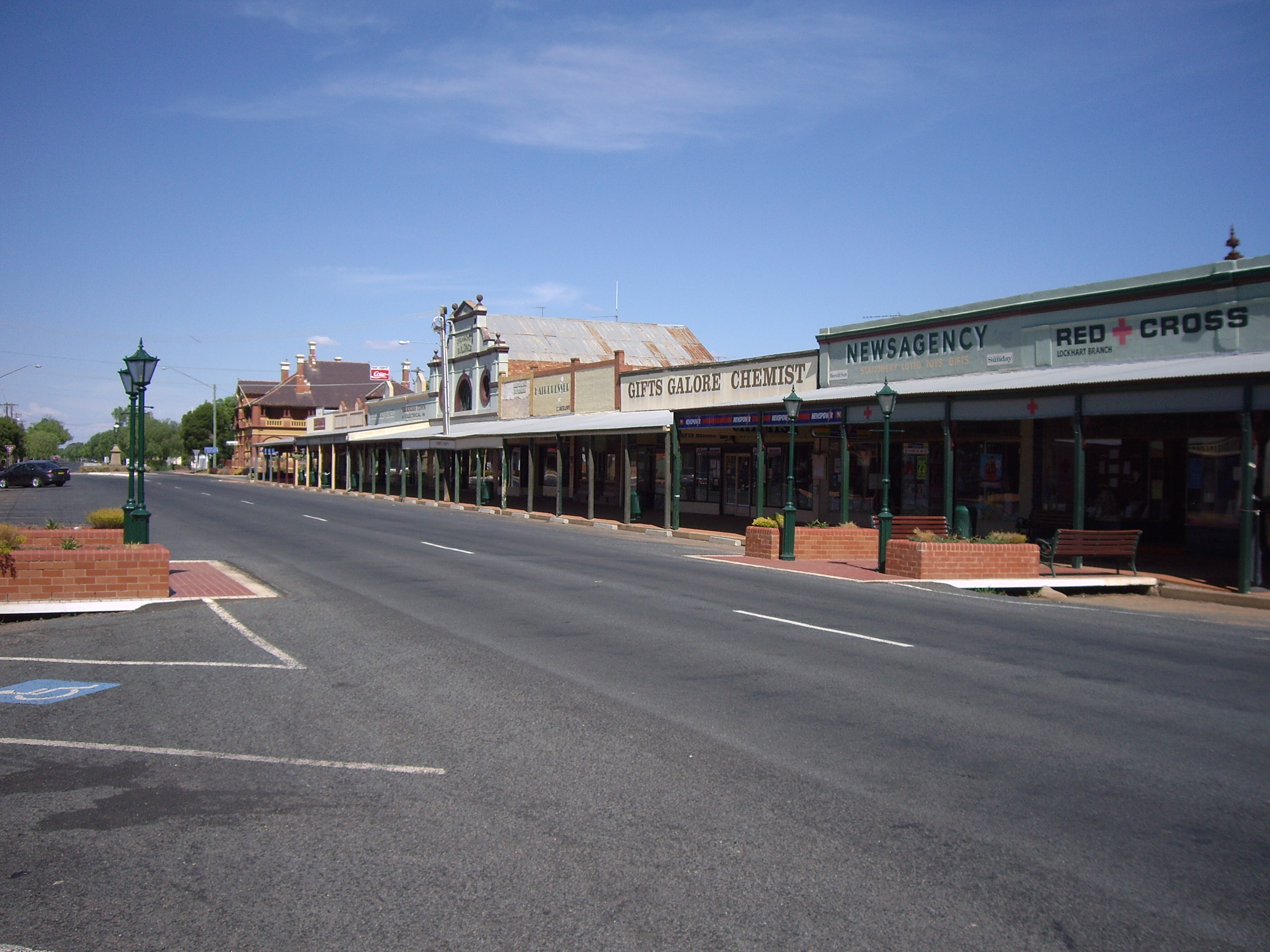
- Looking east in the main street of Lockhart

- Coordinates: 35°13′0″S 146°43′0″E
- Population: 818 (2016 census)
- Postcode(s): 2656
- Elevation: 157 m (515 ft)
- Location: 521 km (324 mi) from Sydney; 405 km (252 mi) from Melbourne; 63 km (39 mi) from Wagga Wagga
- LGA(s): Lockhart Shire
- County: Urana
- State electorate(s): Wagga Wagga
- Federal division(s): Riverina

Lockhart is a town in the Riverina Region of New South Wales, Australia. It is the location of the Lockhart Shire Council. At the 2016 census, Lockhart had a population of 818 people.

== History ==
Lockhart was named after C.G.N. Lockhart – a commissioner for Crown Lands in the Murrumbidgee River area in the 1850s. It was originally known as Greens Gunyah, and renamed Lockhart in 1897. Greens Gunyah was so named because a Mr. Green was the earliest settler, a stockman who had a grog shop on the Urana–Wagga Wagga stagecoach route.

Ferriers Post Office opened on 16 May 1882 and was renamed Lockhart in 1898.

In 1915, the Lockhart – Roll of Honour was unveiled, with 86 locals enlisted in National Service.

A railway station served the town between 1901 and 1975, it has now been restored and converted into a New South Wales Rural Fire Service station. Seasonal grain trains service silos in the town.

Lockhart formerly had a rugby league team who competed in the Group 13 Rugby League competition. The club wore blue and red jerseys.

Tim Fischer, National Party leader (1990–1999) and 10th Deputy Prime Minister of Australia was born here.

== Attractions ==
=== Water Tower Mural ===
In October 2018 a water tower mural was opened in a park in the main street of Lockhart. It was created by artists Scott Nagy and Janne Birkner (Krimsone) in just three weeks and depicts a cascading waterfall surrounded by local flora and fauna. The mural covers a surface of over 600 square metres. Since the tower was painted, visitor numbers are up by close to 37 per cent.

=== Spirit of the Land Festival ===
Lockhart is home to the annual Spirit of the Land Festival, a celebration to the resilience of those who live and work on the land. The festival, held on the second weekend in October, includes a competition for sculptures created from recycled farm materials. Many of the entries from past years are found in the park around the water tower mural and in other locations on the Lockhart Sculpture and Heritage trail.

== Notable Former Residents ==
- Trevor Carrodus (Australian rules footballer)
- Tim Fischer (Australian politician)
- Stan Livingstone (Australian rules footballer)
- Bill Peach (Australian journalist)
- Josh Wooden (Australian rules footballer)

== Gallery ==
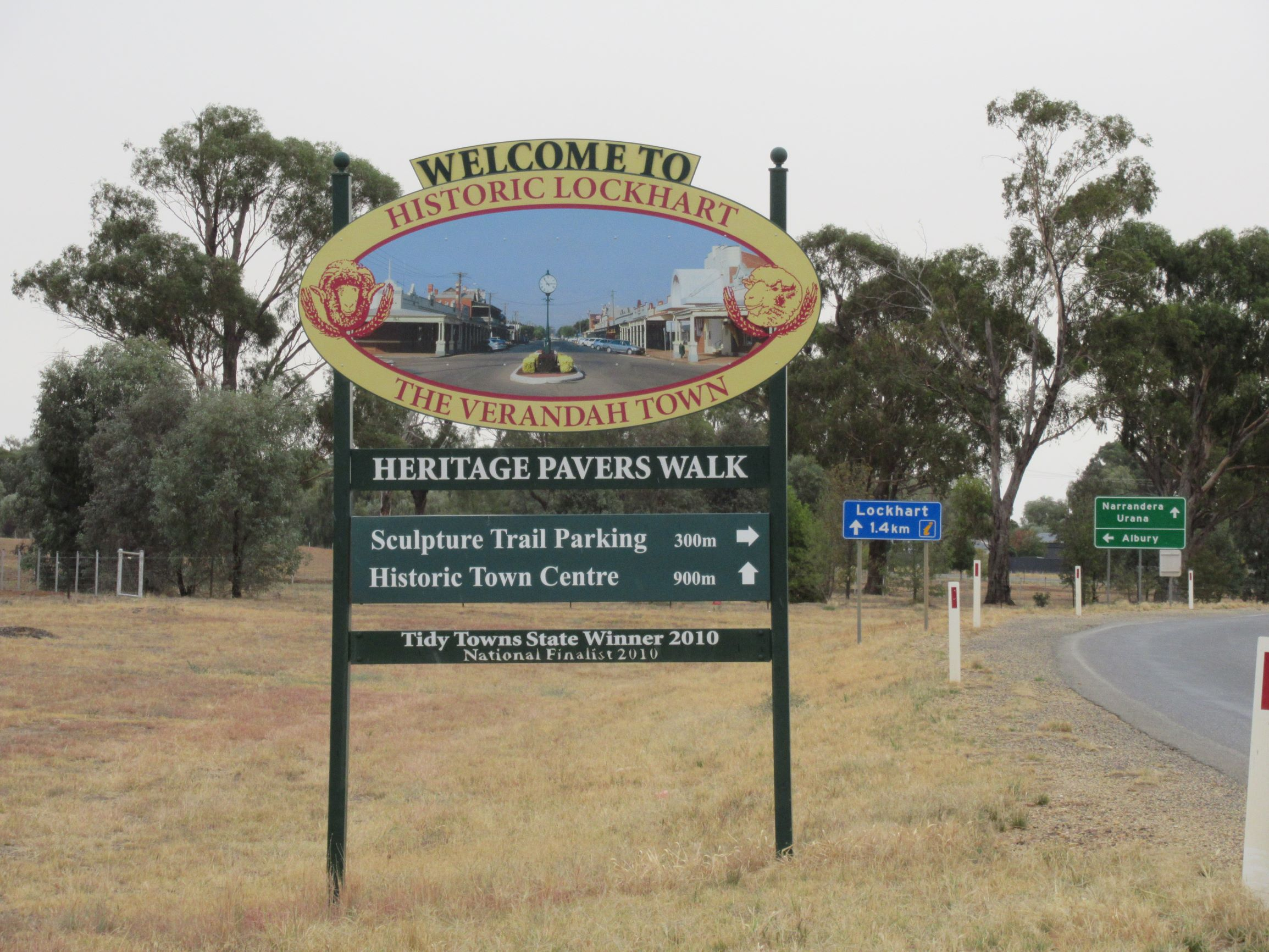
Entrance sign for Lockhart, New South Wales, Australia

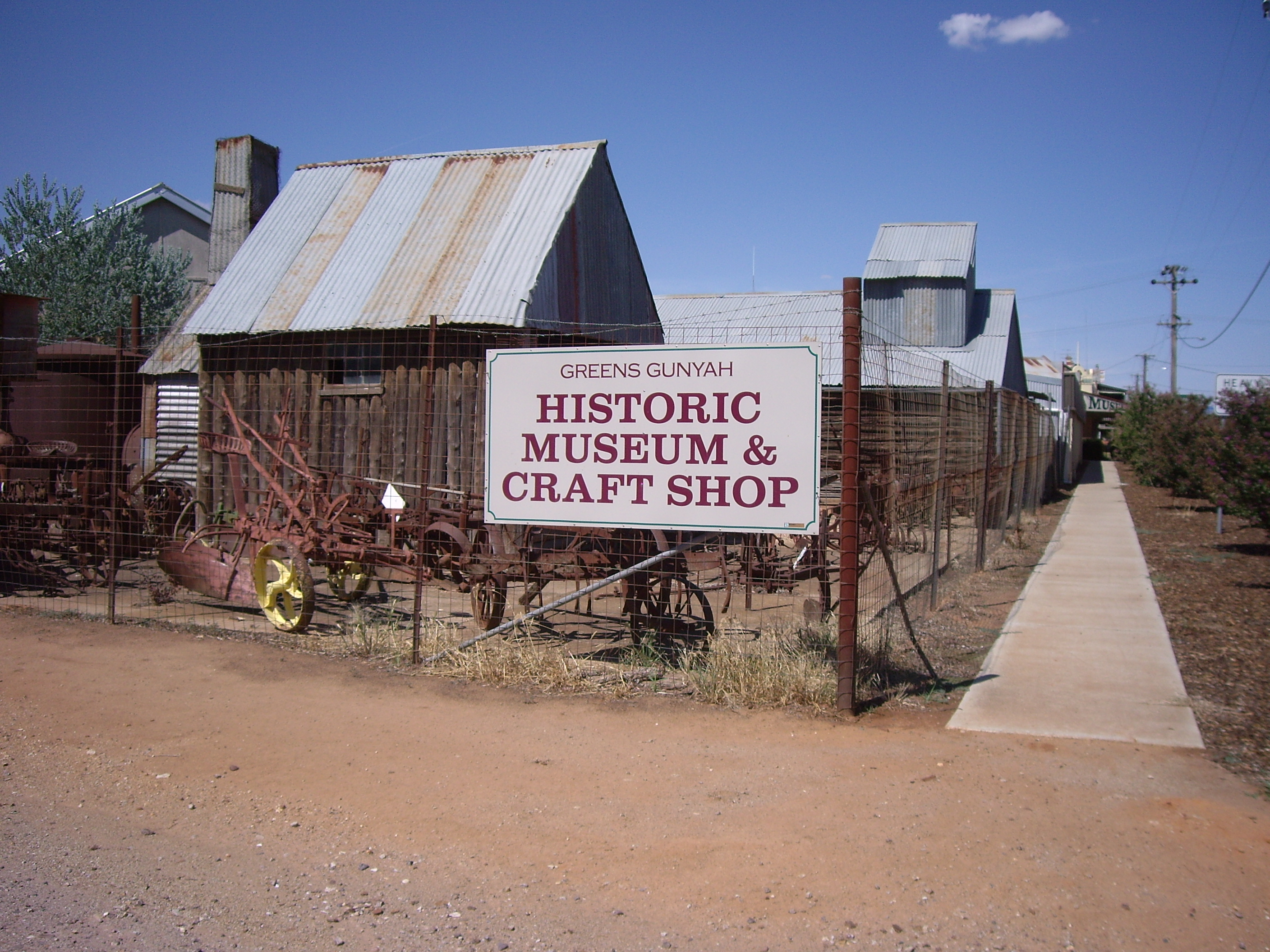
Greens Gunyah Museum

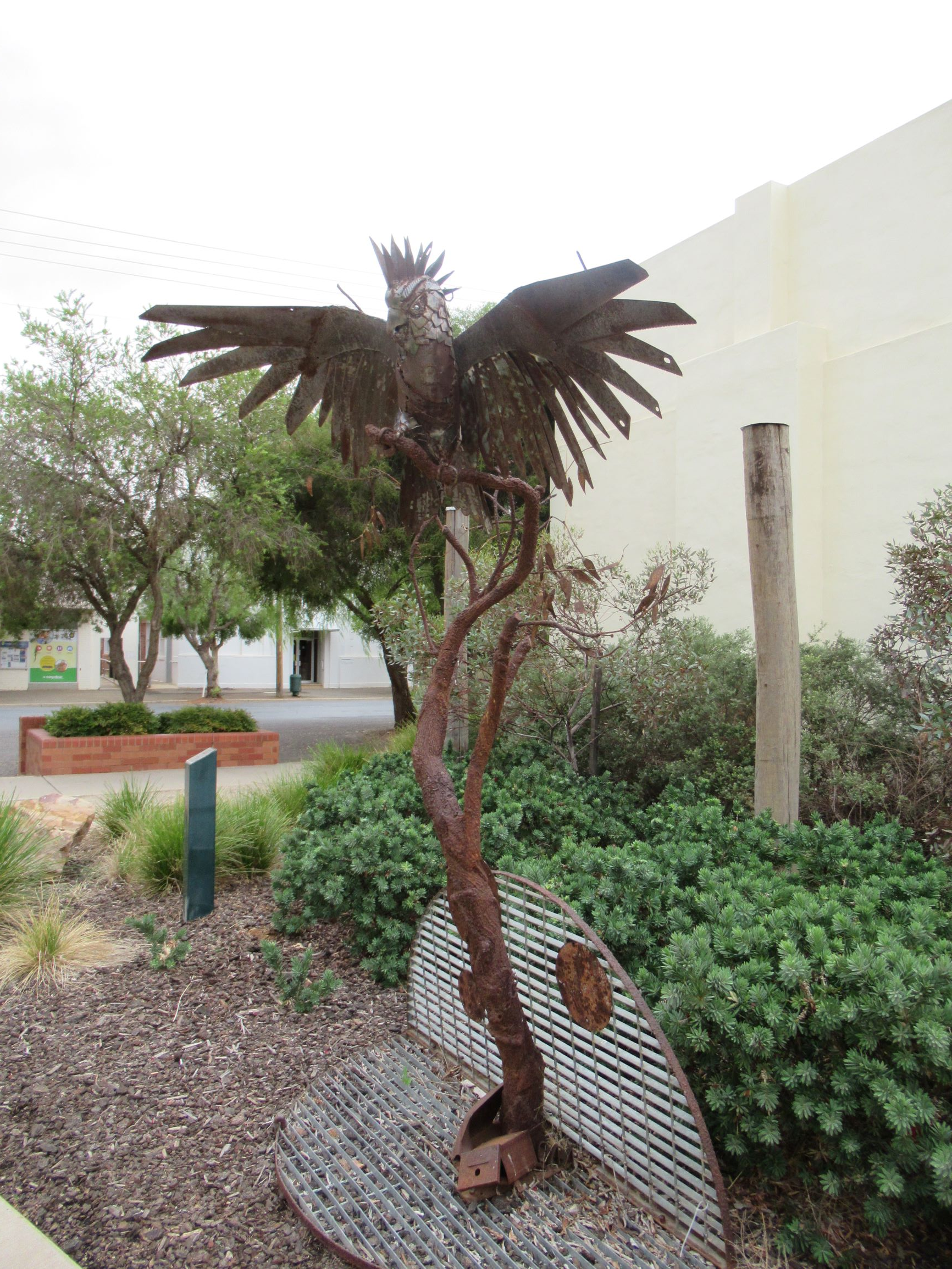
Rusty Cockatoo at Spirit of the Land Festival

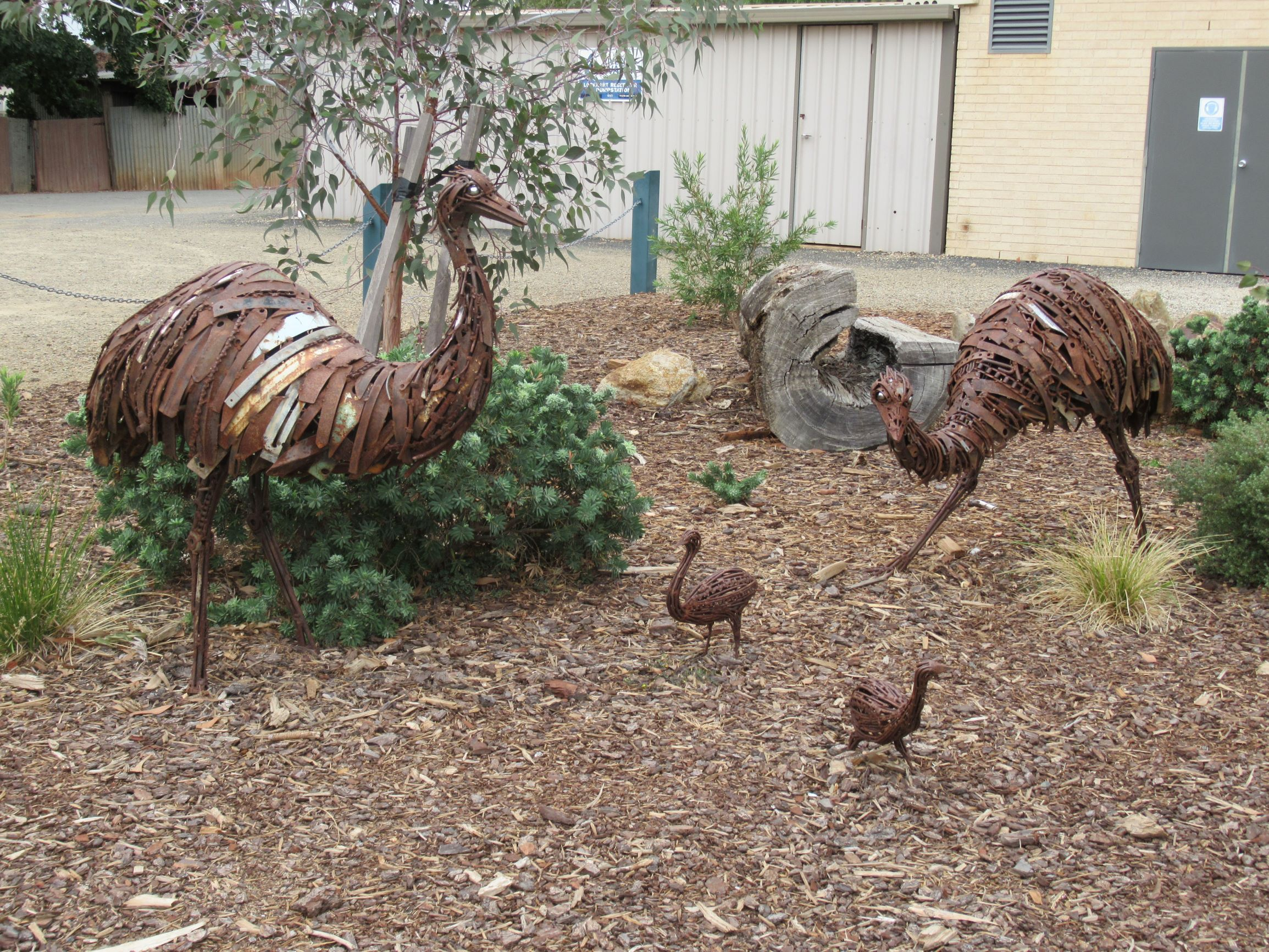
Emu Family Sculpture at Spirit of the Land Festival

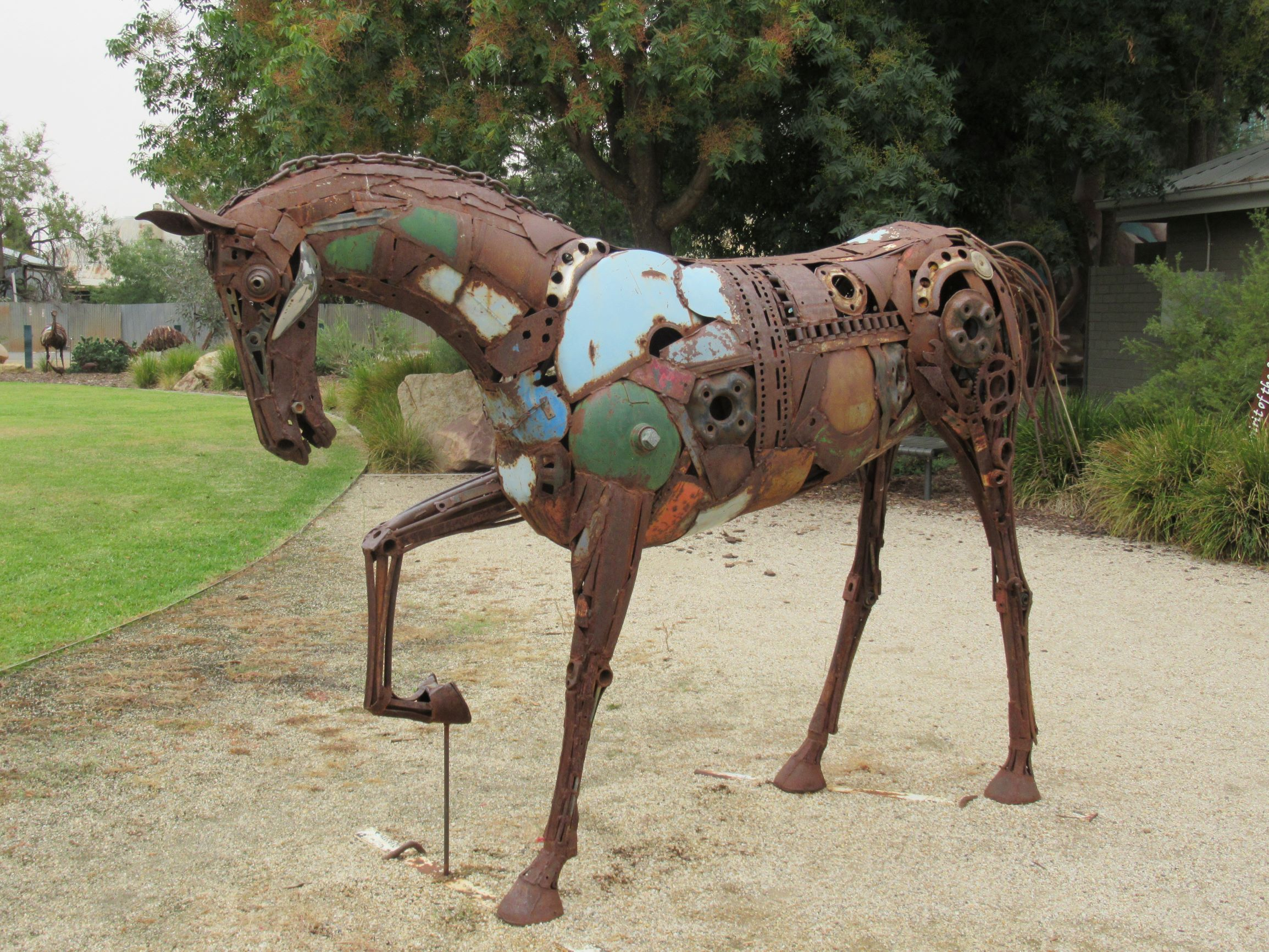
Horse Power Statue at Spirit of the Land Festival

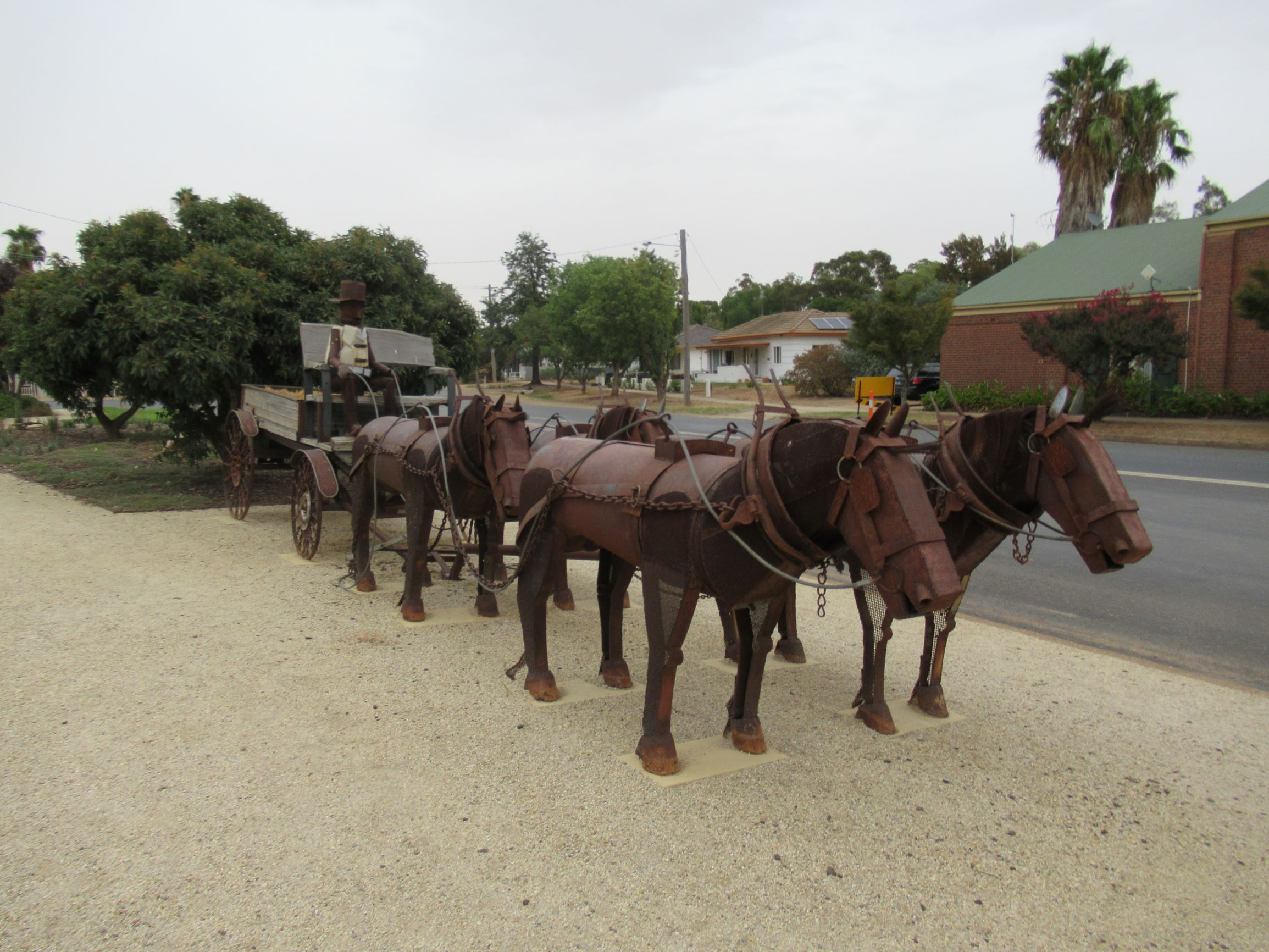
Good Old Days at Spirit of the Land Festival

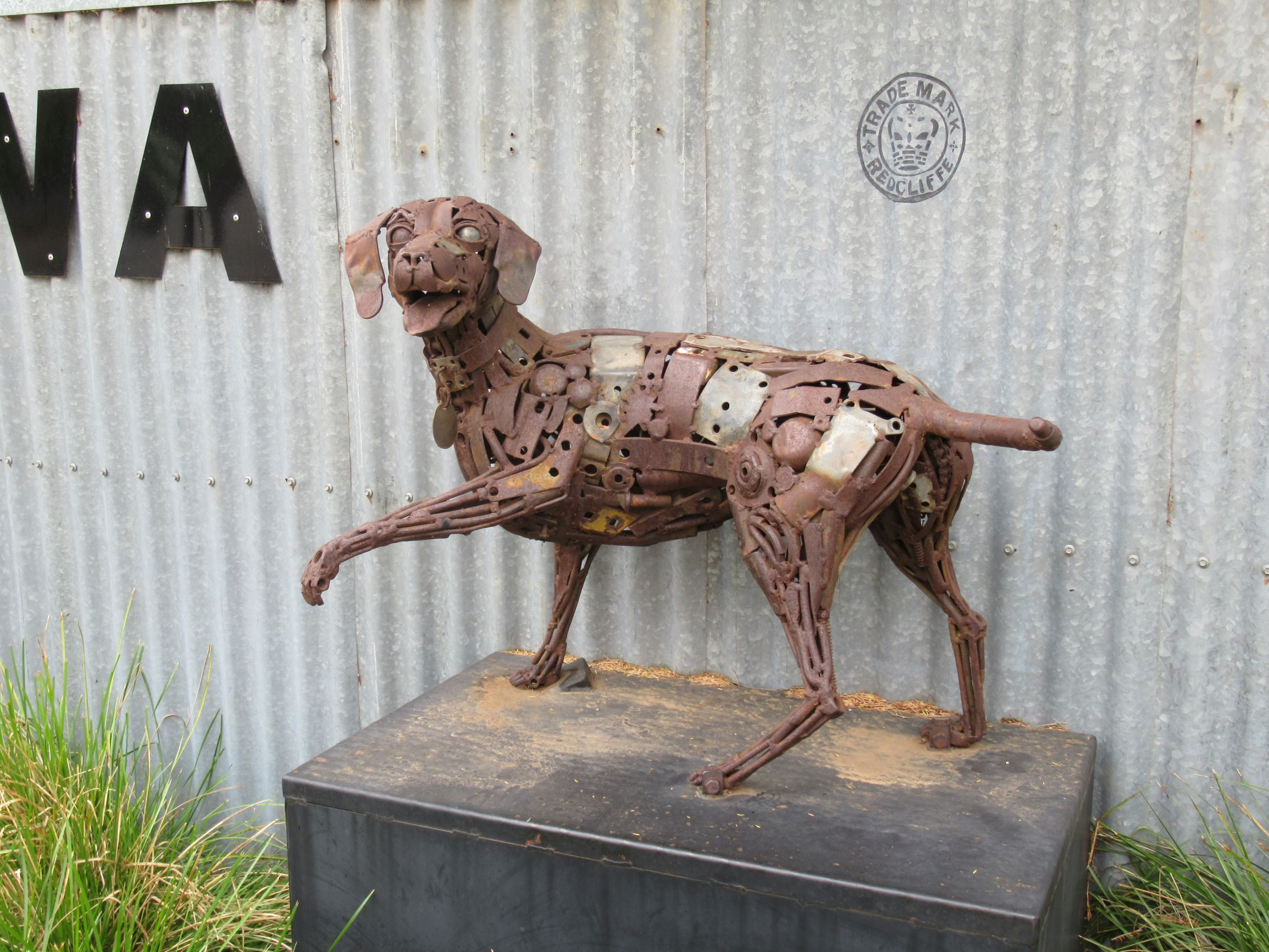
Bonnie Dog at Spirit of the Land Festival

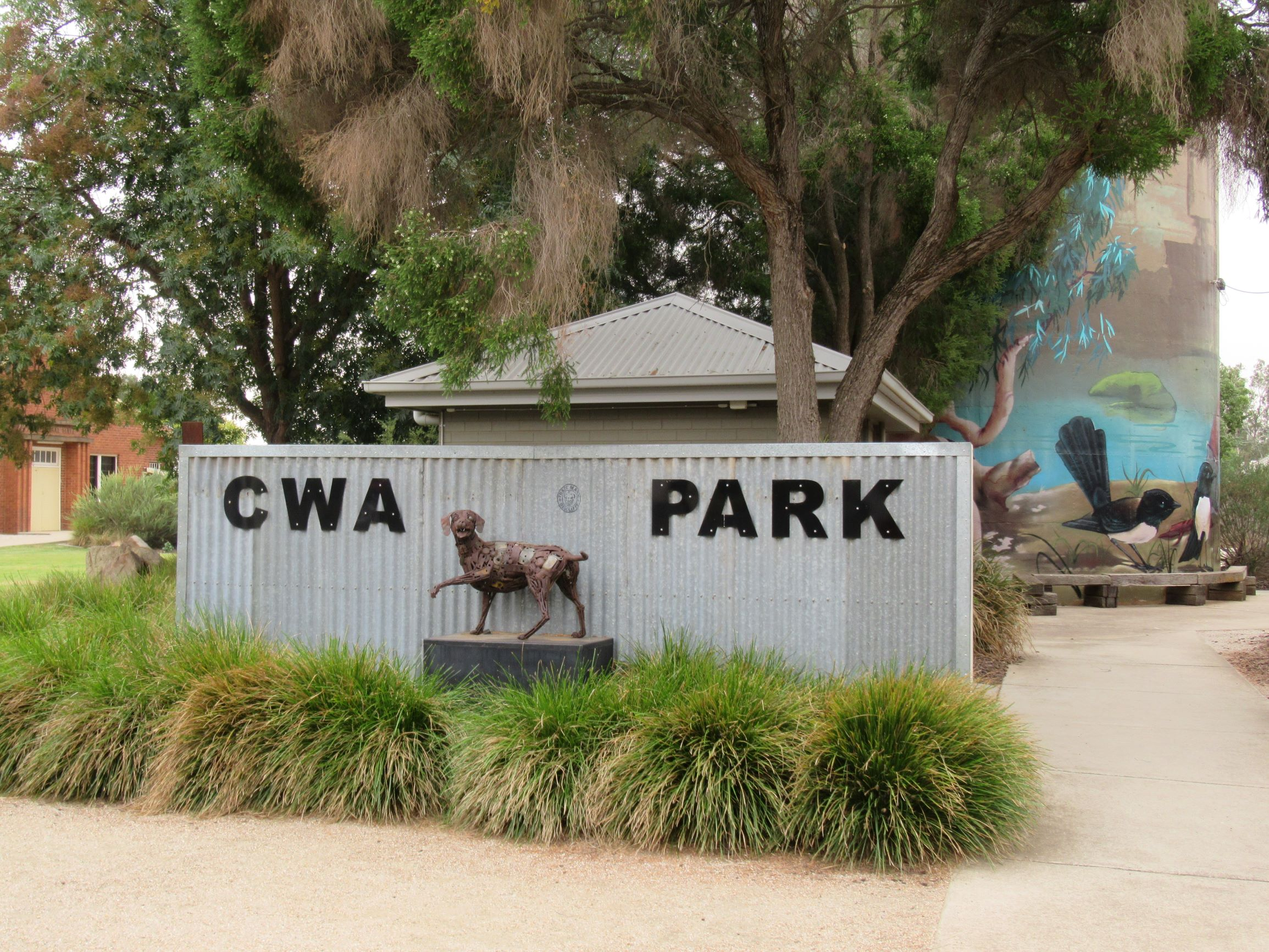
Tower Mural

== See also ==
- Oaklands railway line, New South Wales (Railway through Lockhart)
- Farrer Football League Premiers / Best & Fairest winners lists
- Lockhart FNC website
- Lockhart Football Club
- Albury & District Football League
- Farrer Football League
- Hume Football League

Preceding station	Former services	Following station
Long Park towards Oaklands	Oaklands Line	Napier towards The Rock
