= The Rock, New South Wales =

The Rock
- Town
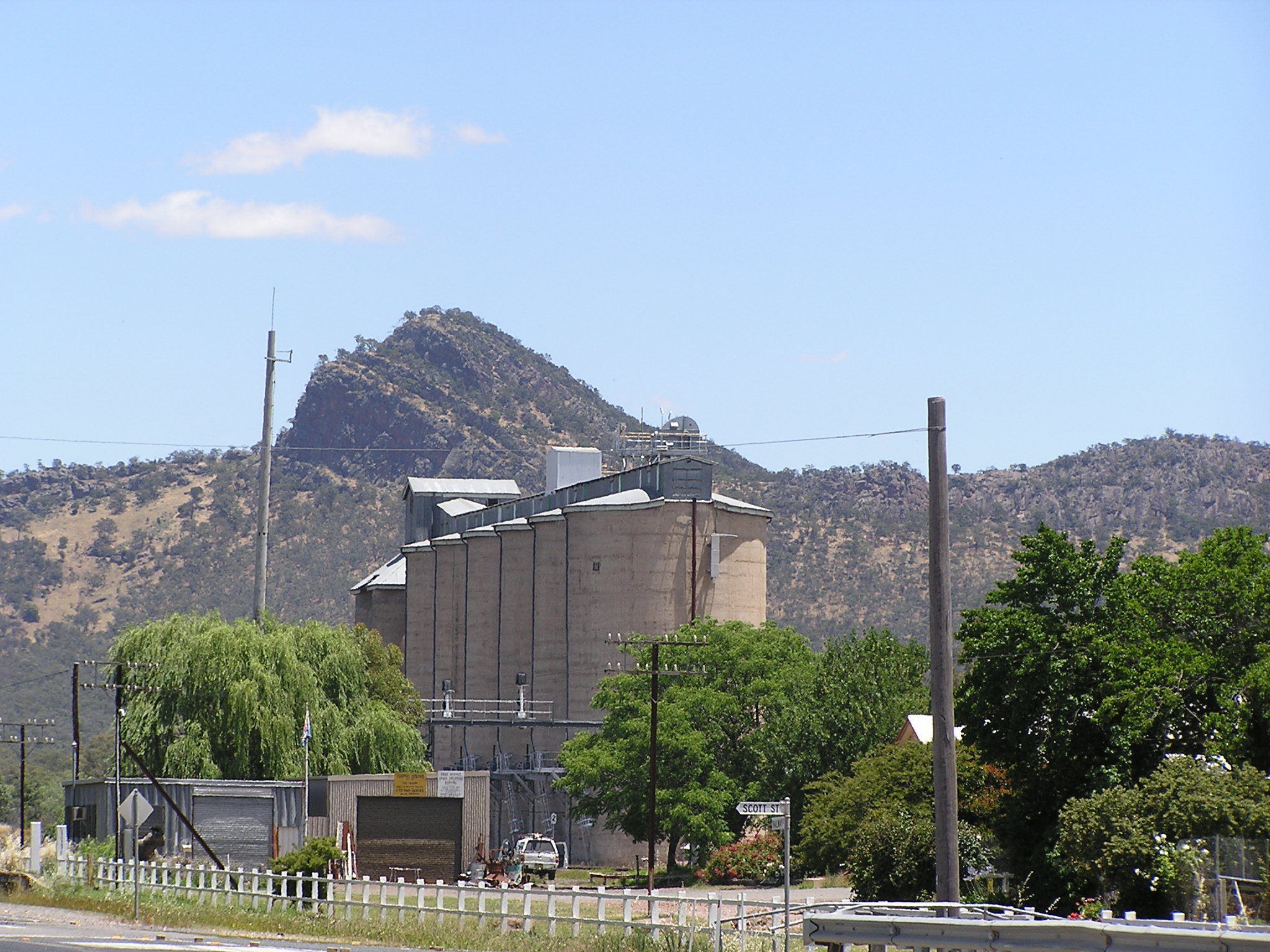
- View across the rail lines and grain silos to The Rock Hill c.. 2005

- Coordinates: 35°16′0″S 147°06′0″E
- Country: Australia
- State: New South Wales
- LGA: Lockhart Shire
- Location: 30 km (19 mi) N of Henty; 32 km (20 mi) SW of Wagga Wagga; 97 km (60 mi) N of Albury; 422 km (262 mi) NE of Melbourne; 488 km (303 mi) SW of Sydney

Government
  - State electorate: Wagga Wagga
  - Federal division: Farrer
- Elevation: 236 m (774 ft)

Population
  - Total: 1,347 (2021 census)
- Postcode: 2655
- County: Mitchell

The Rock is a town with a population of 1,347, in the Riverina region of southern New South Wales, Australia, in Lockhart Shire. It is 32 kilometres (20 mi) south-west of Wagga Wagga, on the Olympic Highway.

The town is named after the large rocky hill overlooking it, now called The Rock Hill but called Yerong in the local indigenous language. The reserve that includes The Rock Hill is an attraction for bush-walking, rock-climbing and the observation of wildlife. It is also an Aboriginal sacred site, called Kengal.

== History ==
The Rock Post Office opened on 1 September 1890.

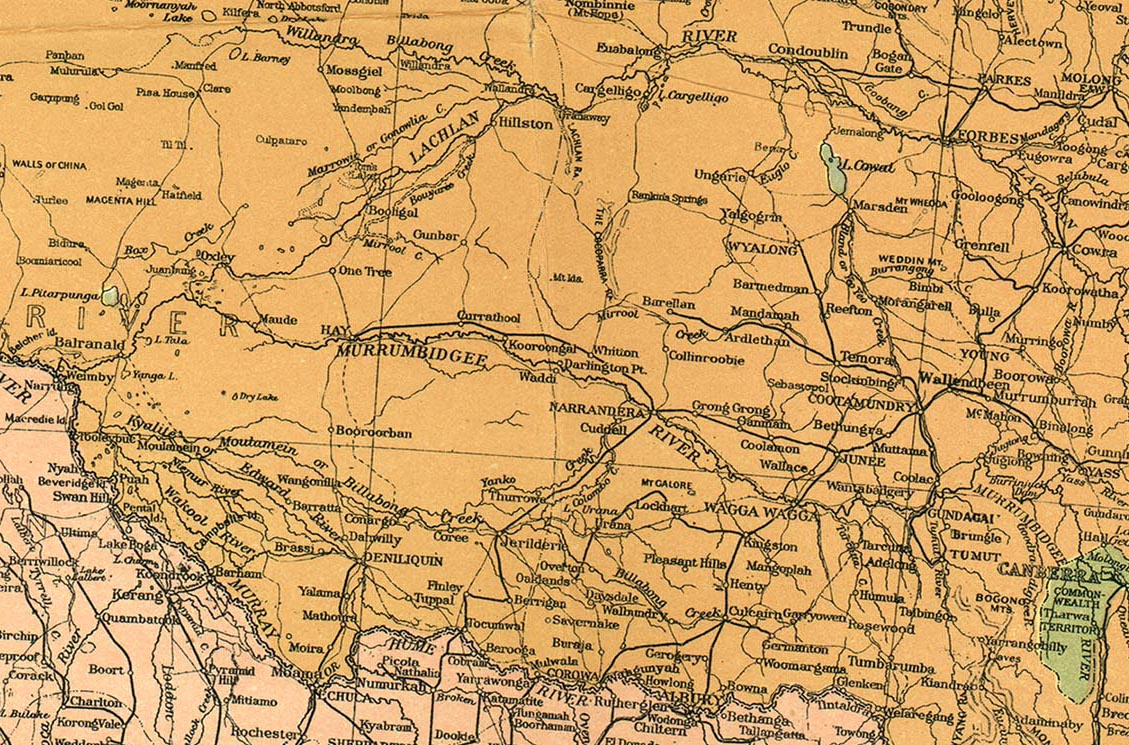
A 1916 map of the Riverina with The Rock named as Kingston

Prior to 1919, the town had been known as Kingston, probably named after the King family, which had operated the local farming property known as "The Rock". The name Kingston is shown on a 1916 map of the Riverina district. The King name survives with the hotel on the Olympic Highway at the town still named The King's Own.

== Heritage listings ==
The Rock has a number of heritage-listed sites, including The Rock railway station on the Main Southern railway

== Sport and recreation ==
The Rock Football Club was an Australian Rules Football club that was established in 1900 after a meeting at the King's Own Hotel. The club has played in the following football competitions -

- 1900: Wagga United Football Association.
- 1901: McLaurin Football Competition: Runners Up
- 1902–09: Club active, playing friendly matches against local clubs and towns, but no evidence of playing in an official competition.
- 1910–12: The Rock Football Association:
- 1913: Wagga United Football Association: Runners Up: 1913
- 1914: Nathan Cup Competition – Premiers: 1914
- 1915: Wagga Football Association.
- 1916: Club active, but no official competition due to WW1.
- 1917: The Culcairn Patriotic Football Association
- 1918: Yerong Creek & District Football Association. The Rock played against Mangoplah and Yerong Creek.
- 1919–1921: Wagga United Football Association. The Rock withdrew form the Wagga United FA in June & joined The Rock & District Football Association.
- 1921: The Rock & District Football Association.
- 1922: Riverina Main Line Football Association
- 1923–1925: Wagga United Football Association. Runners Up: 1925
- 1926–1927: The Rock Football Association. Runners Up: 1927
- 1928 – Wagga & District Football Association. Runners Up: 1928 As the minor premiers, Magoplah were entitled to challenge The Rock to another game and ultimately won the Grand Final replay.
- 1929–1937: The Rock & District Football League: Premiers: 1932, 1936 Runners Up: 1934, 1937
- 1938–1940: Albury & District Football League: 1938–1940.
- 1941–1944: Club in recess due to WW2.
- 1945–1947: Milbrulong & District League: Premiers: 1945, 1947 (undefeated)
- 1948–1957: Albury & District Football League: Runners Up: 1948, 1956 & 1957.
- 1957–1961: Farrer Football League
- 1962 – Farrer Football League: The Rock FC & Yerong Creek FC merged in 1962 to form The Rock Yerong Creek FC.

The Rock Cricket Club won the 1938/39 Henty & District Cricket Association premiership, defeating Henty. The Rock scored 7/441 in their second innings, with the three Taylor brothers all scoring centuries!

The Rock also had a rugby league team, which competed in the Group 13 Rugby League competition. The club wore maroon jerseys with a sky-blue V.

== Transport ==
There is a railway junction at The Rock, being the place where the Boree Creek line branches from the Main South line. The Rock railway station is served by the twice-daily NSW TrainLink XPT service between Melbourne and Sydney.

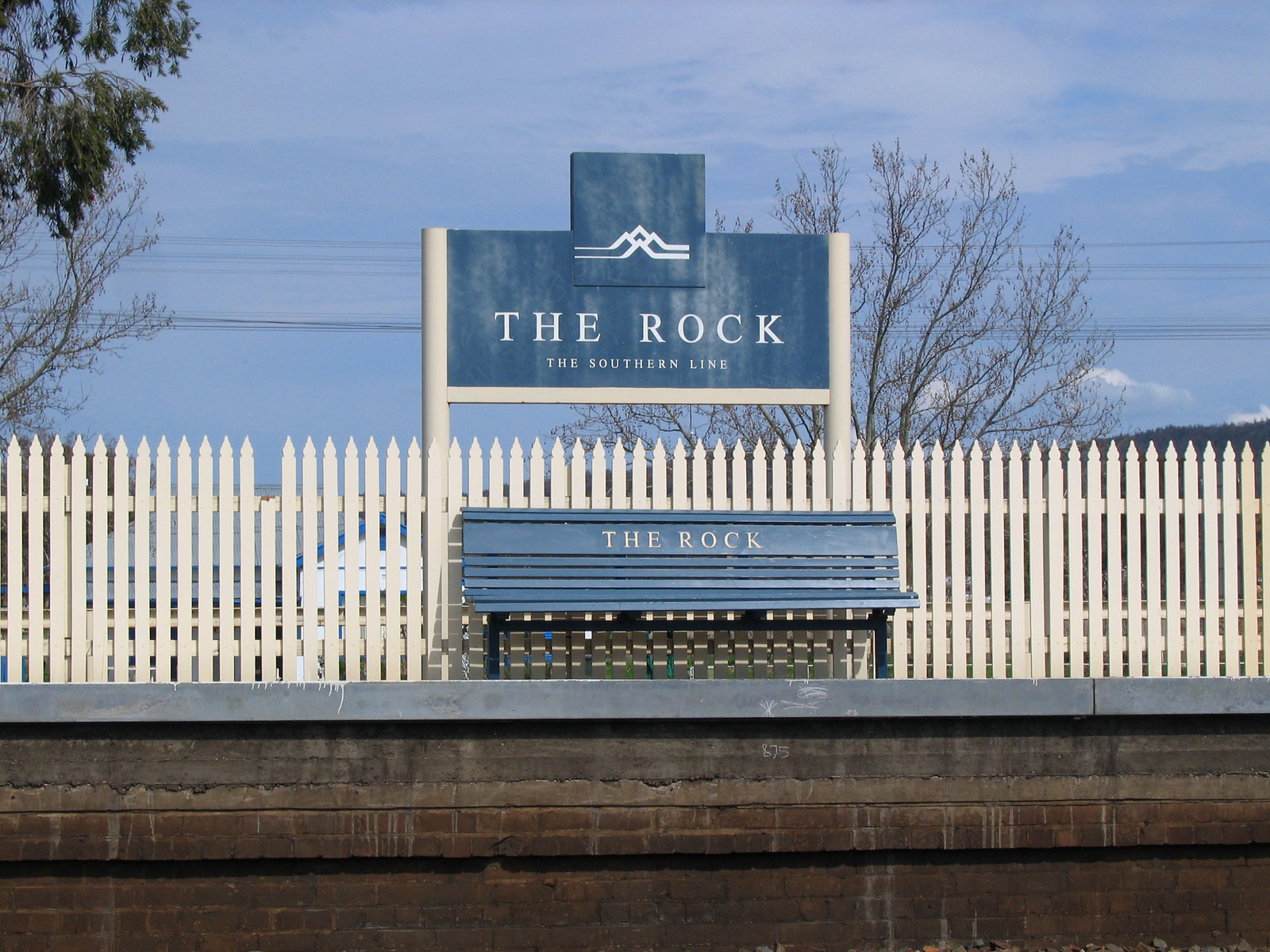
The Rock railway station, 2006
