= Trevor Carrodus =

Australian rules footballer

Personal information
- Full name: Trevor Carrodus
- Born: 29 November 1952 (age 73)
- Original team: Lockhart
- Height: 188 cm (6 ft 2 in)
- Weight: 82 kg (181 lb)

Playing career^{1}
Years	Club	Games (Goals)
1971–72	South Melbourne	3 (3)
- ^{1} Playing statistics correct to the end of 1972.

Trevor Carrodus (born 29 November 1952) is a former Australian rules footballer who played with South Melbourne in the Victorian Football League (VFL).
