= Oaklands, New South Wales =

Oaklands
- Town
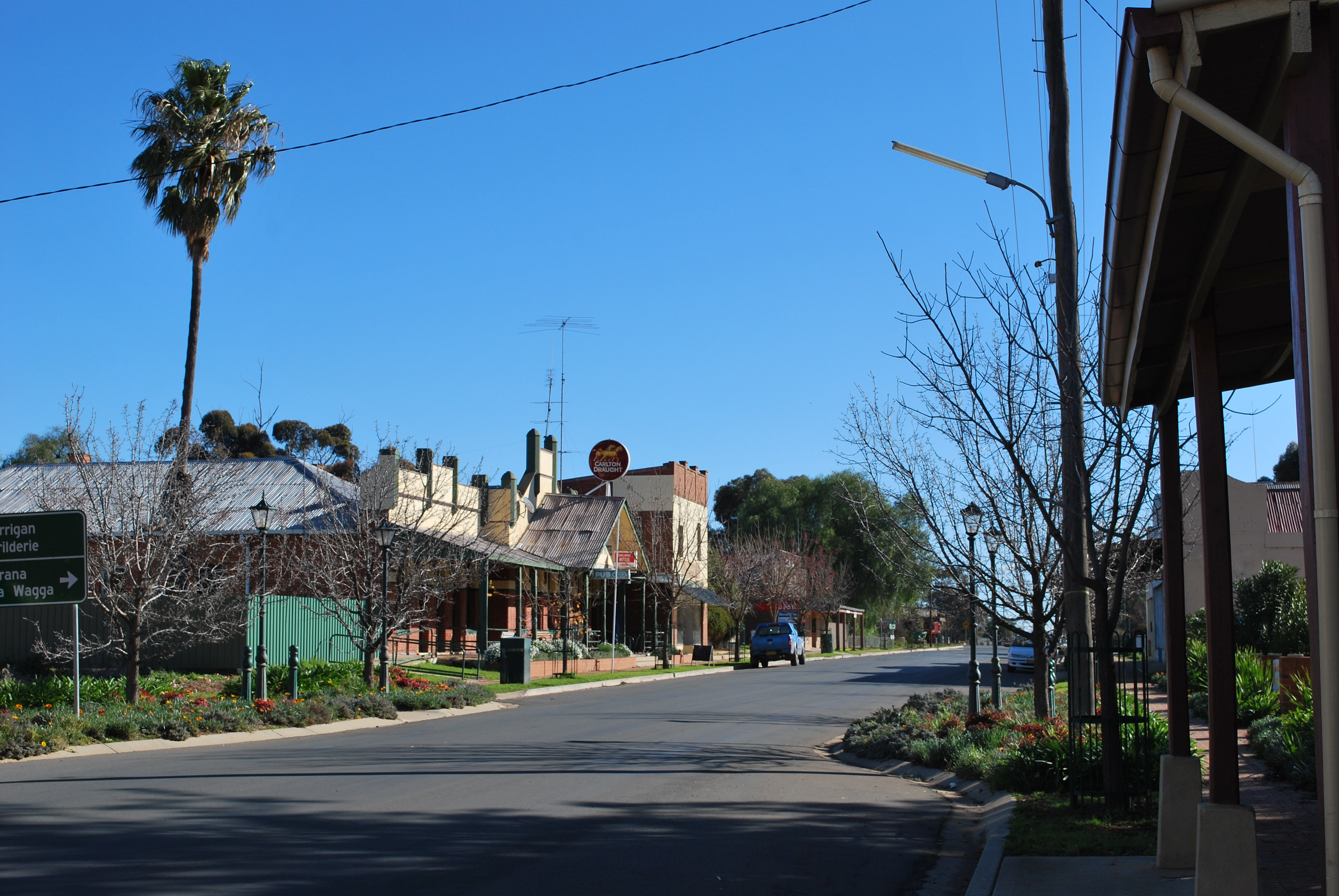
- Milthorpe Street, the main street of Oaklands, 2009

- Coordinates: 35°32′0″S 146°10′0″E
- Country: Australia
- State: New South Wales
- LGA: Federation Council
- Location: 615 km (382 mi) SW of Sydney; 335 km (208 mi) NW of Melbourne; 144 km (89 mi) SW of Wagga Wagga; 61 km (38 mi) NW of Corowa

Government
  - State electorate: Murray
  - Federal division: Farrer
- Elevation: 128 m (420 ft)

Population
  - Total: 304 (2021 census)
- Postcode: 2646
- County: Urana

Oaklands is a town in the Riverina district of southern New South Wales, Australia. It is 615 kilometres south-west of the state capital, Sydney, and 105 kilometres north-west of Albury. Oaklands is in the Federation Council local government area and, at the 2021 census, had a population of 304.

Oaklands has a pub, bowls club, swimming pool, kindergarten-to-Year-12 school, and a day-care centre.

== History ==
The earliest European settlers in the district of Oaklands were the Tyson brothers, James and William, who established themselves in 1846.

Oaklands post office was opened on 16 June 1890.

The major industry in the Oaklands region is agriculture, including the production of wheat and rice and is a major grain handling area. It is the home of the Oaklands Diuris, a threatened native orchid that is currently only found in the Oaklands region.

== Rail ==
A standard gauge branch line from the New South Wales Government Railways Main South line at The Rock was extended from Lockhart to Oaklands in 1912.

A broad gauge branch line from the Victorian Railways North East line at Benalla was extended from Yarrawonga to Oaklands in 1938, creating a break-of-gauge station until the New South Wales line was closed south of Boree Creek. There were several stations between Yarrawonga and Oaklands, which are now the site of grains silos.

After the conversion to standard gauge of the Victorian North East railway in 2008, the Oaklands branch was for a time a gauge orphan. Following persistent lobbying, the 113-kilometre (70 mi) branch was also converted to standard gauge.

Oaklands is 321 km by rail from Melbourne, and was 675 km by rail from Sydney.

| Preceding station | Former services | Following station |
|---|---|---|
| Terminus | Oaklands Line | Coorabin towards The Rock |

== Gallery ==
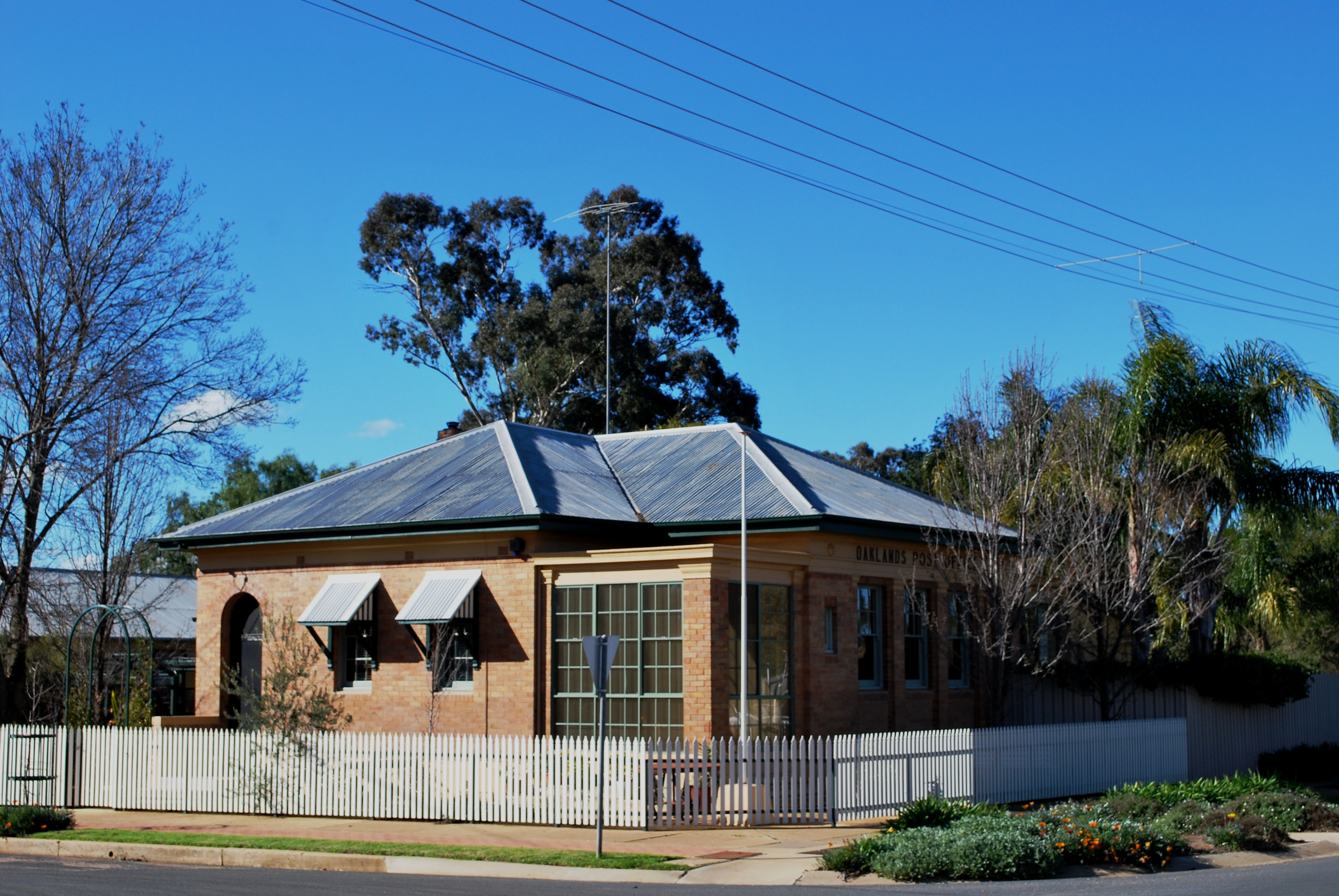
Former post office, 2009

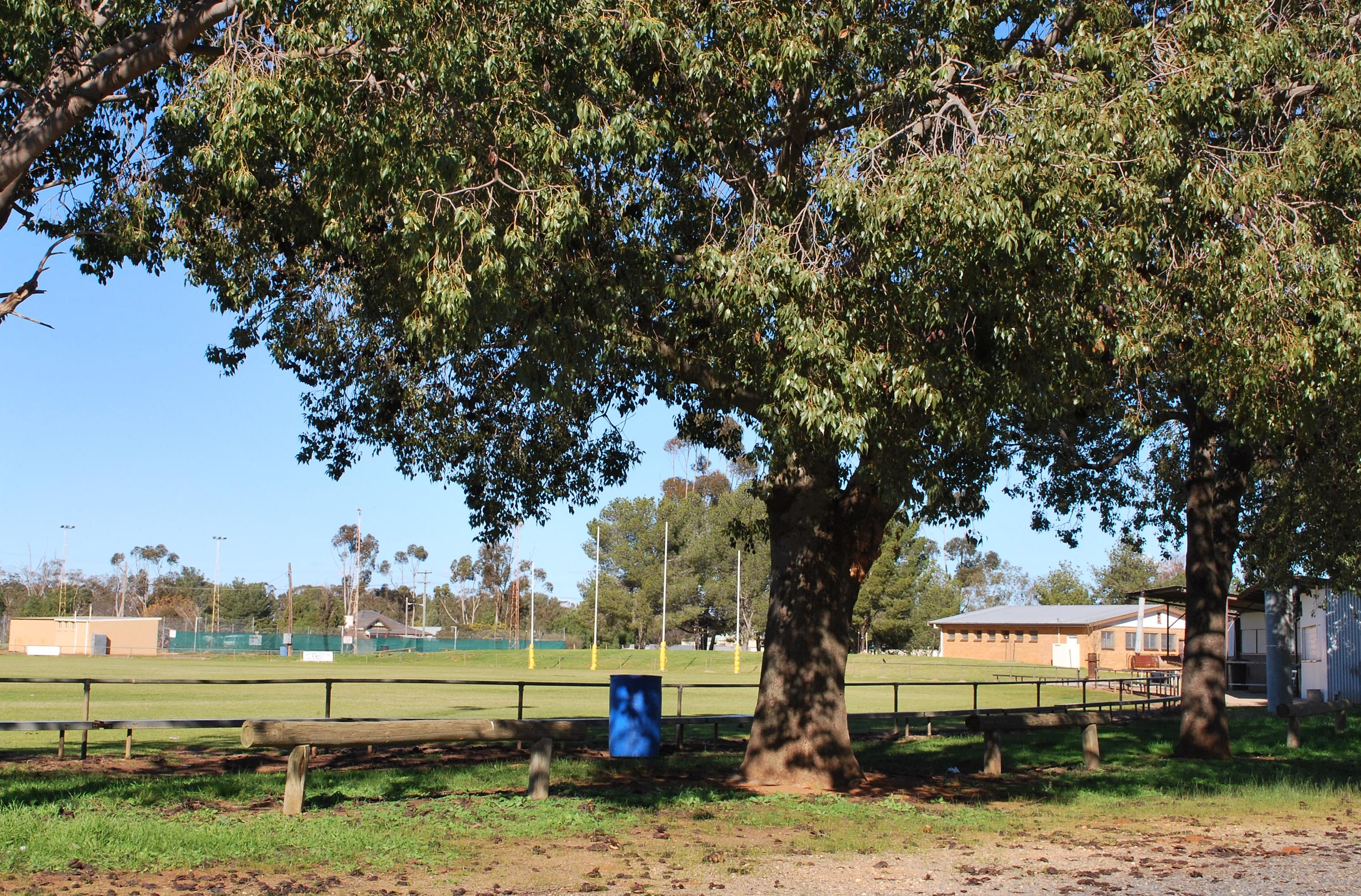
Australian rules football ground, 2009

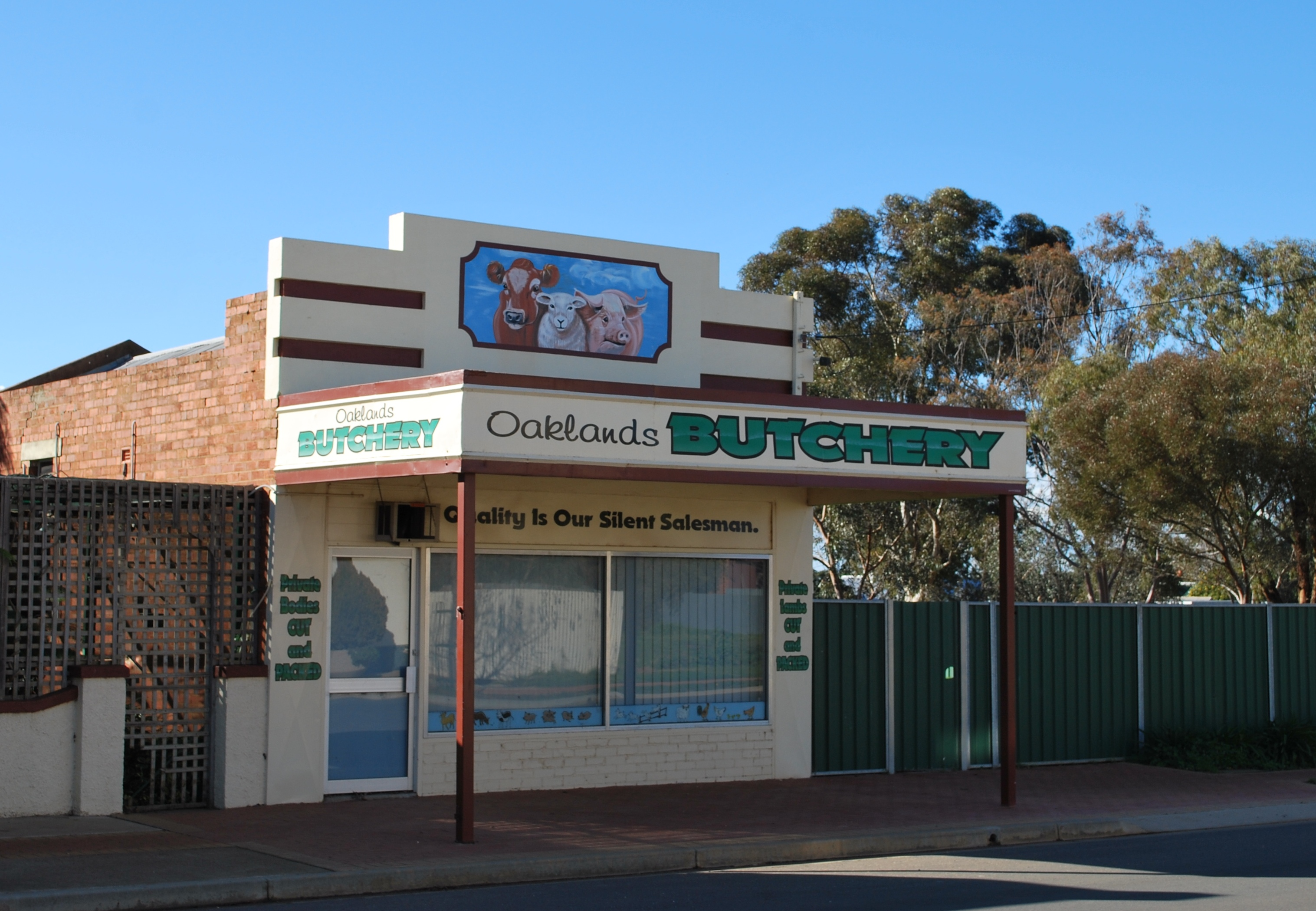
Former butcher shop, 2009

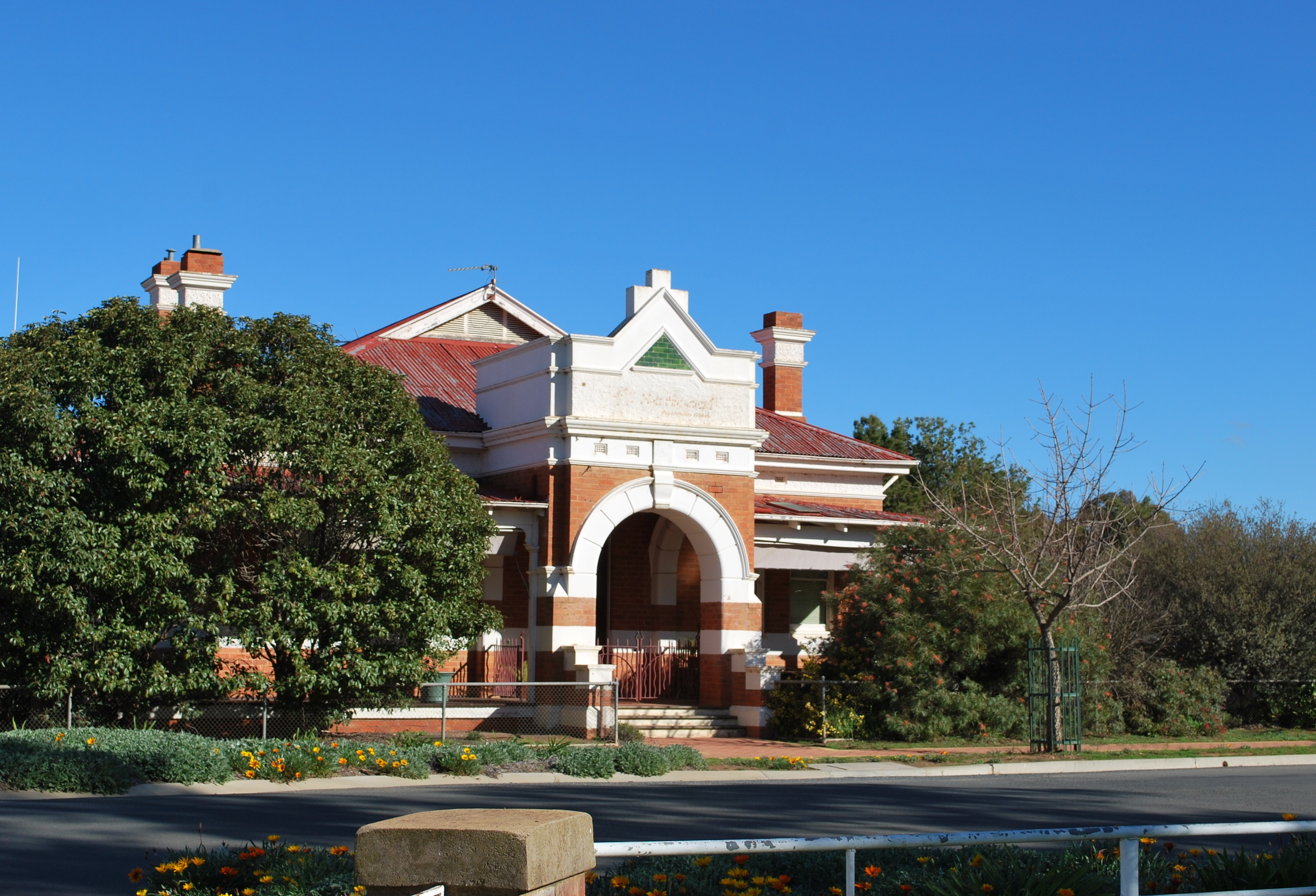
Former CBC bank, 2009
