= The Rock railway station =

Railway station in New South Wales, Australia

The Rock
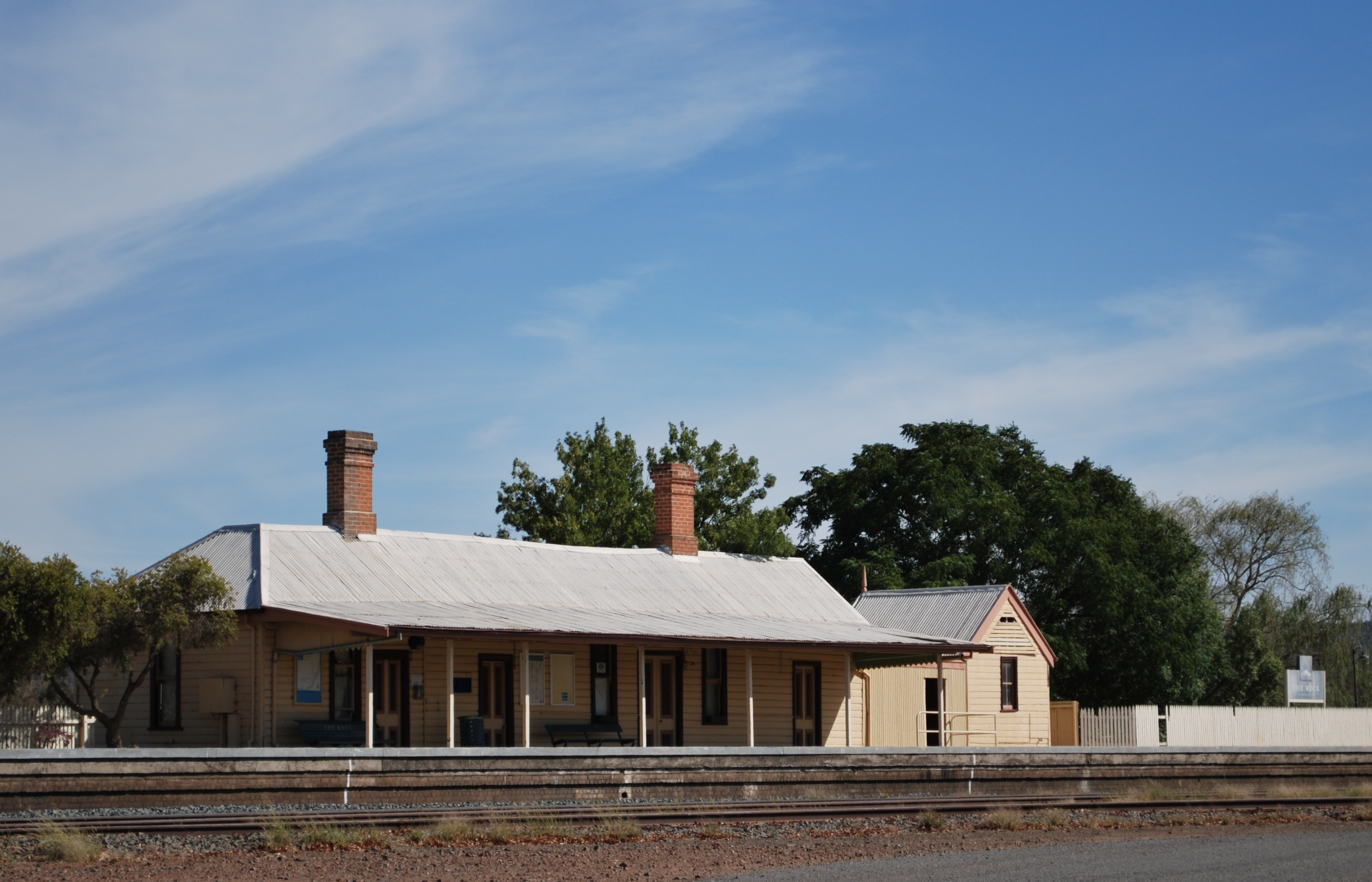
- Station building and platform, March 2009

General information
- Location: Olympic Highway, The Rock
- Coordinates: 35°16′18″S 147°07′06″E
- Owner: Transport Asset Manager of New South Wales
- Operator: NSW TrainLink
- Lines: Main Southern line; Oaklands line
- Distance: 550.29 km (341.93 mi) from Central
- Platforms: 1
- Tracks: 3

Construction
- Structure type: Ground
- Parking: Yes
- Accessible: Assisted access

Other information
- Station code: TRK

History
- Opened: 1 September 1880; 145 years ago
- Former names: Hanging Rock (1880–1882); Kingston (1882–1883)

Services
Preceding station	NSW TrainLink	Following station
Henty towards Melbourne	NSW TrainLink Southern Line Melbourne XPT	Wagga Wagga towards Sydney
Former services
Preceding station	Former services	Following station
Yerong Creek towards Albury	Main Southern Line	Bon Accord towards Sydney
Tootool towards Oaklands	Oaklands Line	Terminus

New South Wales Heritage Register
- Official name: The Rock Station and yard group
- Type: State heritage (complex / group)
- Designated: 2 April 1999
- Reference no.: 1268
- Type: Railway Platform / Station
- Category: Transport – Rail
Location
- Location within New South Wales

The Rock railway station is a heritage-listed railway station and antique shop located on the Main Southern line in The Rock in the Lockhart Shire local government area of New South Wales, Australia. The station is also known as The Rock Station and yard group. The property was added to the New South Wales State Heritage Register on 2 April 1999.

== History ==
The Rock railway station opened on 1 September 1880 as Hanging Rock when the Main South line was extended from Wagga Wagga to Gerogery. It was renamed Kingston on 28 December 1882, and finally The Rock on 10 February 1883.

On 8 July 1901, The Rock became a junction station with the opening of the Oaklands line as far as Lockhart. It gained a locomotive depot and carriage shed at the same time.

From the late 1950s, The Rock became a railmotor depot, gaining an allocation of four CPH railmotors that were used on all services south of Junee to Albury and on the Oaklands, Rand, Holbrook and Kywong lines. After these services were withdrawn in 1974, the depot was demolished in 1978.

== Services ==
The Rock is served by two daily NSW TrainLink XPT services in each direction operating between Sydney and Melbourne. This is a request stop, so the train stops only if passengers booked to board/alight here.

Platform	Line	Stopping pattern	Notes
1	Southern Region	services to Sydney Central & Melbourne	request stop (booked passengers only)

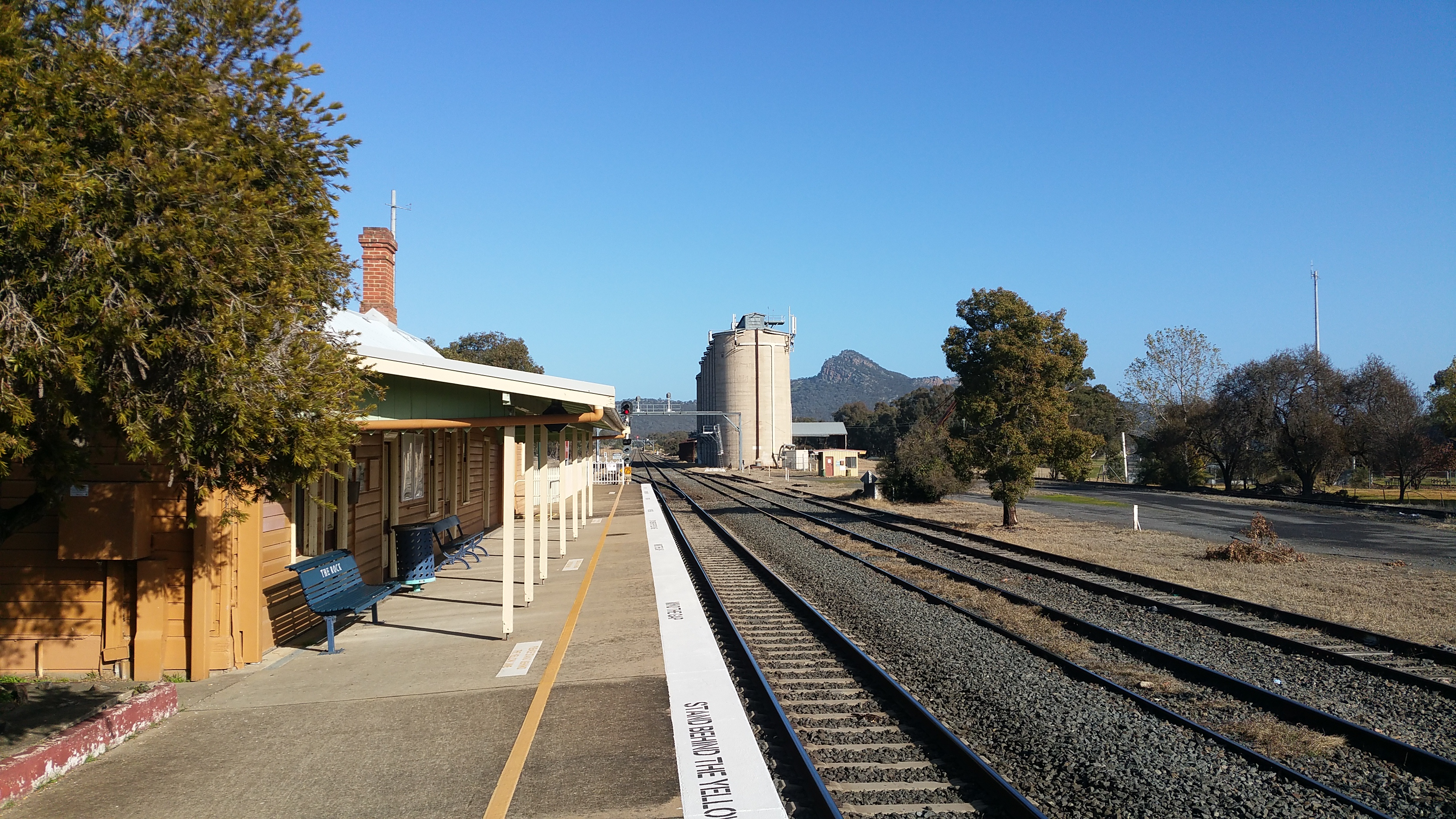
Southbound view on the platform

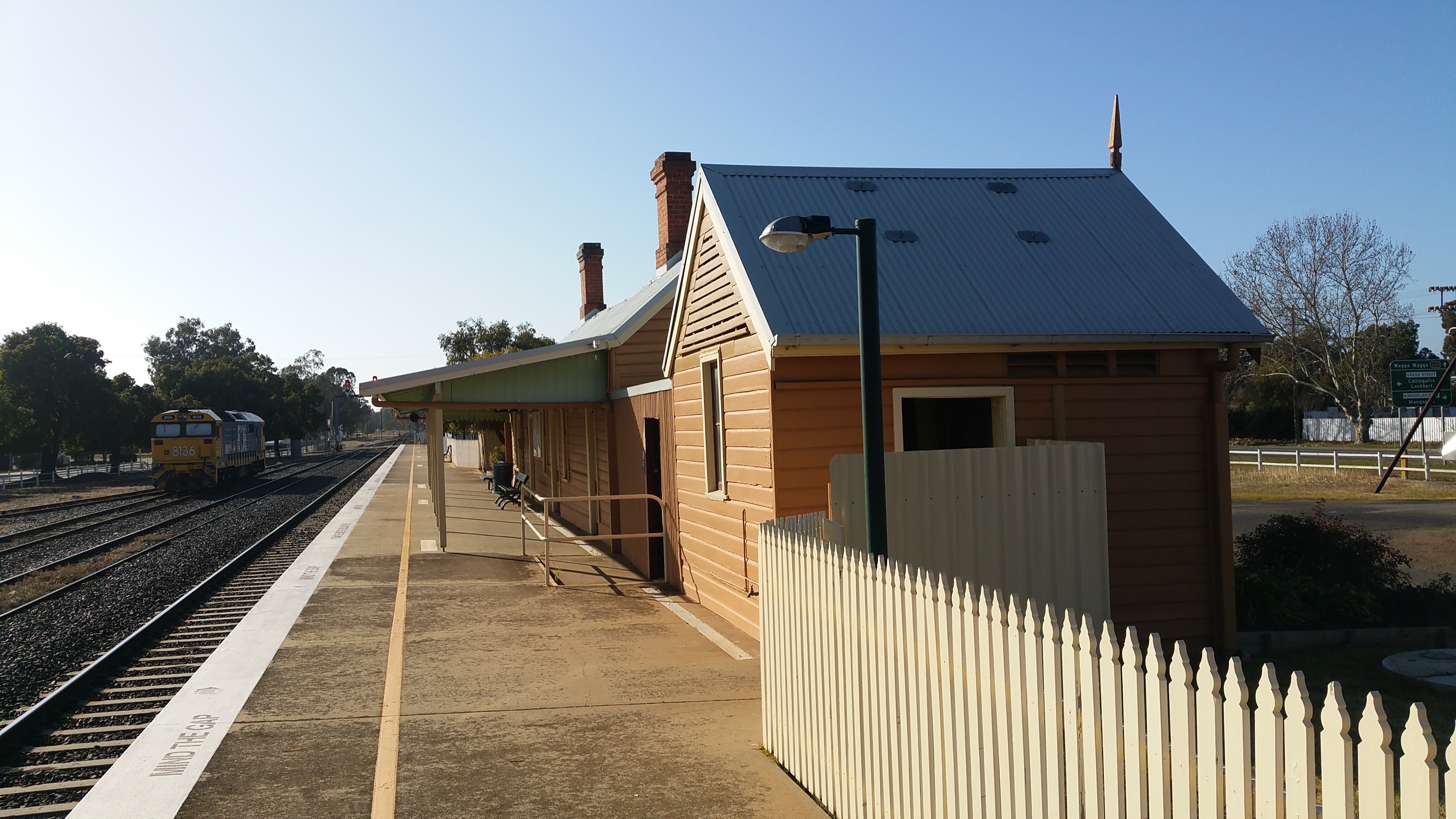
Northbound view on the platform

== Description ==
The complex comprises a type 4 railway station building of standard roadside timber, erected in 1880; and a station master's, type 5 brick residence, erected in 1880. Other structures include a brick platform face, completed in 1880; a crane and platform; and platform signs.

== Heritage listing ==
The railway site is part of an area designated as an urban conservation area in the town. The railway contributes by forming a strong south-eastern boundary to the area intersecting the town at an oblique angle and crossing the significant main street also at an oblique angle. The station is located just off the axis of the main street and contributes a strong visual element to the form of the town. The station building dates from the period of the towns prosperity and is one of the few remaining unaltered structures from that period.

The Rock railway station was listed on the New South Wales State Heritage Register on 2 April 1999 having satisfied the following criteria.

The place possesses uncommon, rare or endangered aspects of the cultural or natural history of New South Wales.

This item is assessed as historically rare. This item is assessed as archaeologically rare. This item is assessed as socially rare.

== See also ==
- List of regional railway stations in New South Wales
