= Oaklands railway line, New South Wales =

Railway line in New South Wales, Australia

Oaklands railway line

Technical
- Track gauge: 1,435 mm (4 ft 8 1/2 in)
- Signalling: Train Order Working
- Train protection system: TMACS

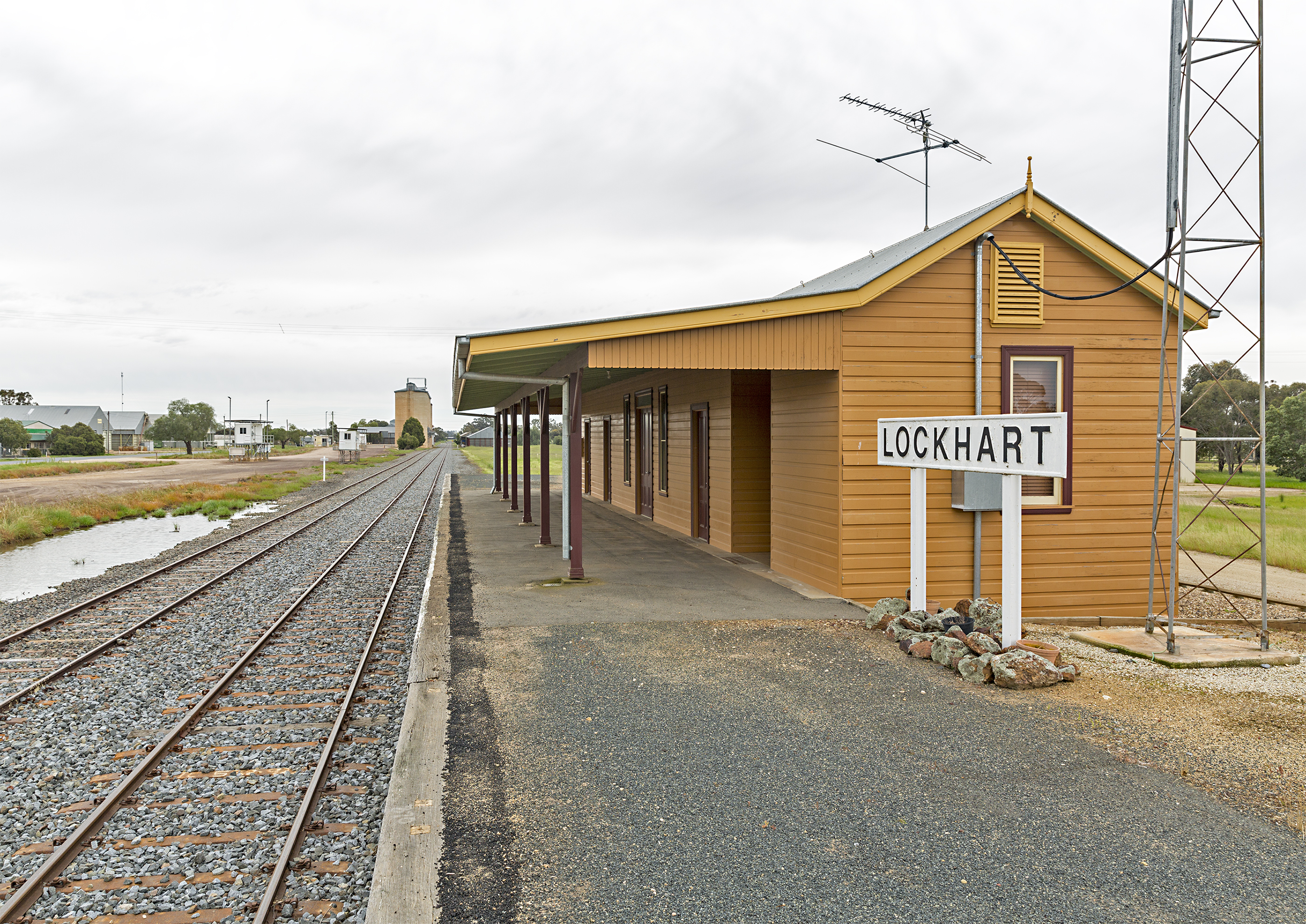
Lockhart railway station

The Oaklands railway line is a partly-closed railway line in New South Wales, Australia. It is a branch of the Main South line at The Rock, and heads in a south-westerly direction through the towns of Boree Creek and Urana, terminating at Oaklands.

The line opened to Lockhart in 1901, and to Oaklands in 1912. Passenger services were withdrawn in 1974, and the line is now closed beyond Boree Creek. Grain haulage provides the main traffic on the line.

From Oaklands, a line heads south to the Victorian border on the Murray River, and then to Benalla, Victoria. That line was formerly Victorian broad gauge, but was converted to standard gauge in 2009.

== See also ==
- Rail transport in New South Wales
- Oaklands railway line, Victoria
