= Aussie Post =

Aussie Post may refer to:

- Australia Post, the government-owned postal service of Australia
- Australasian Post, the magazine
