= Patricia Clarke =

Patricia Clarke may refer to:

- Patricia H. Clarke (1919–2010), British biochemist
- Patricia Clarke (historian) (1926–2026), Australian historian and author
