= Jessie Catherine Couvreur =

Australian novelist (1848–1897)

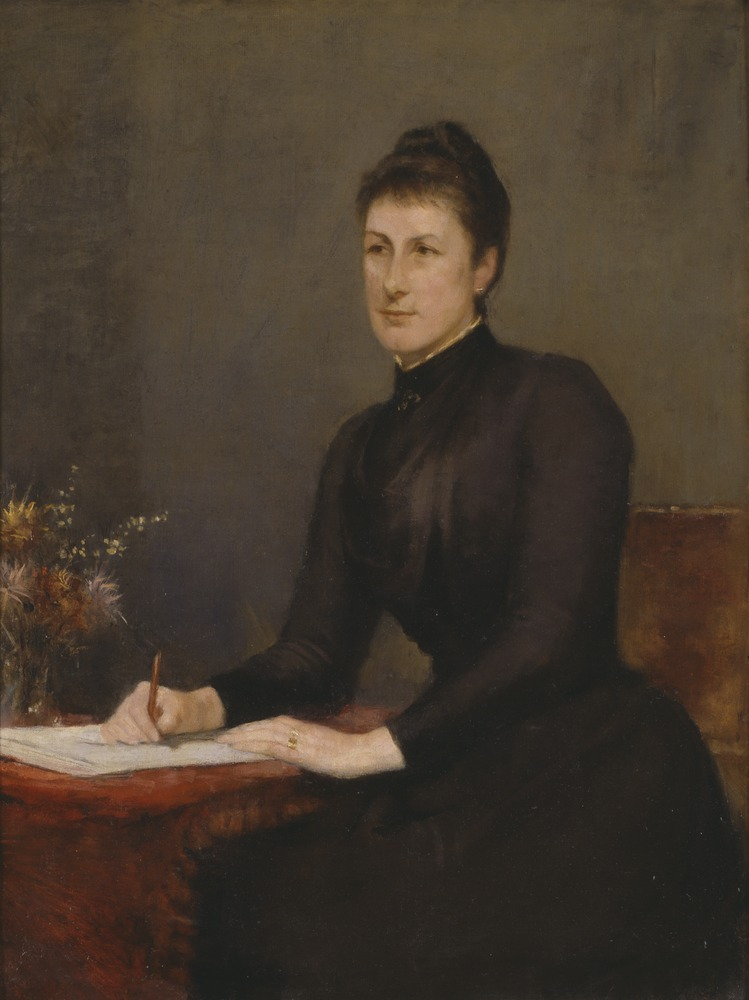
- 1890 portrait by Mathilde Philippson
- Born: 28 October 1848; Highgate, England
- Died: 23 October 1897 (aged 48); Brussels, Belgium
- Other name: Tasma (pen name)
- Occupation: Writer
- Spouses: Charles Forbes Fraser (m. 1867; div. 1883); Auguste Couvreur (m. 1885; died 1894)

Jessie Catherine Couvreur (28 October 1848 – 23 October 1897), also known by her pseudonym Tasma, was an Australian journalist and novelist. The daughter of a Dutch father and Anglo-French mother, Couvreur moved to Australia as a young child and was raised in Hobart. She moved to her husband's home in Kyneton in Victoria at the age of eighteen. Her marriage was unhappy, and she spent much of the next decade living independently in Europe. She became well-known as a lecturer, delivering public talks about Australian life to large audiences across France and Belgium. She also published short stories and articles in Australian and European publications.

In 1883 Couvreur briefly returned to Australia to divorce her husband, before returning to Belgium and marrying the journalist and politician Auguste Couvreur. After her second marriage, Couvreur began to focus on writing novels; her first, Uncle Piper of Piper's Hill, was a major success and brought her fame as a novelist. She followed this with five more novels that were each focused on women's mistreatment by their cruel and abusive husbands. After her husband's death in 1894, she took up his position as the Brussels correspondent for The Times and became one of only two senior female employees at the publication. She died just two years later.

== Life ==
=== Early life ===
Jessie Catherine Couvreur was born Jessie Huybers in Highgate, London, on 28 October 1848. She was the daughter of a Dutch wine merchant, James Alfred Huybers, and a mother of English and French ancestry, Charlotte Sophia (née Ogleby). Her mother was well-educated, with a strong interest in literature and the arts, and operated a girls' boarding school at the time of Jessie's birth. The family moved to Hobart when Jessie was four years old. Jessie's father built a large merchant and warehousing business, while her mother educated Jessie and her siblings at home. During her teenage years, Jessie published poetry; just one poem, published in the Australian Journal in 1869, is known to have survived.

=== Lecturing and writing ===
Despite her mother's opposition, Jessie Huybers married Charles Forbes Fraser on 8 June 1867 at the age of 18. They moved to Kyneton in Victoria soon after their marriage, where Charles Fraser became involved in horse-racing and gambling and began to suffer financial strain. She periodically left her husband to return to her parents' home. In 1873 Jessie travelled to England with her mother and siblings, leaving her husband behind in Australia. They later left England and settled in Brussels, where Jessie provided an education to her younger siblings, and then moved to Paris nineteen months later. Jessie and her sisters spent time studying art at the École Professionnelle pour Jeunes Filles. She also became involved in discussions about women's rights and attended feminist events. She returned to Victoria in October 1875, where she learned that her husband had fathered a child with one of their servants. She left her husband and moved in with her mother (who had also separated from her husband) in Melbourne, where she began to develop friendships with the city's writers. She published her first works of fiction in 1877, and soon she began regularly publishing short stories and articles in newspapers and periodicals. Her first non-fiction article, "A Hint to the Paris Commissioners", was published in The Australasian the same year. The majority of her writing throughout her career was published under the pen name "Tasma", a shortening of "Tasmania".

After Charles Fraser declared bankruptcy in 1878, Jessie Fraser returned to Europe; while he promised to send her £100 annually, she ultimately received just £10 from him in total. After her arrival in England she began publishing articles about London in Australian newspapers, and then settled in Paris a few months later. She continued publishing articles on a range of topics, including politics, science, and the arts. Her writing also described Australia's natural landscape and economic opportunities. She often wrote articles about social issues and the European public sphere based on her own personal observations; for instance, to prepare to write an article about poverty in Paris, she spent a night in a shelter for homeless men. In July 1880, Jessie was invited by the Société de Géographie Commerciale de Paris to deliver a lecture about Australia. The lecture was a success, and she soon began delivering public talks about Australia across Europe under the name "Jessie Tasma". In Antwerp in March 1881 she delivered a lecture to an audience of 1200 people, after which she was invited to meet with Leopold II of Belgium. She was named an Officier d'Académie by the President of France for her lectures. She also published a romance novella set on an Australian station titled "L'Amour aux Antipodes" in serial form in France and Belgium in 1880.

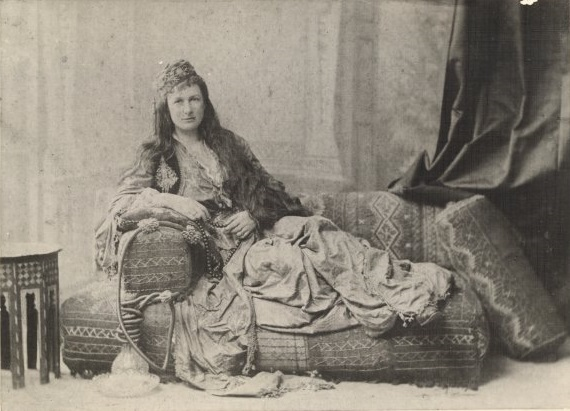
Tasma in Turkish costume, 1889.

In 1883 Jessie Fraser returned to Australia to seek a divorce from her husband, which he did not contest. Despite the rarity of divorce at the time—women had limited grounds for seeking a divorce, and there were typically fewer than 10 granted in the colony of Victoria each year—the divorce was granted by the Victorian Supreme Court on the basis of adultery and desertion. While in Melbourne she wrote a serial titled "Mr. Schenck's Pupil" for The Australasian, which was published in early 1885.

After eight months in Melbourne, Jessie returned to Europe and married the Belgian journalist and politician Auguste Couvreur on 7 August 1885. Her marriage to Auguste Couvreur increased her financial security and allowed her to focus on writing fiction. She published her first and best-known novel, Uncle Piper of Piper's Hill, in 1889. The novel, which depicts middle-class Melbourne society and the egalitarianism of the Australian colonies, was positively received in England and in Australia and saw two reprintings. According to the scholar Patricia Clarke, the work was seen as the "book of the season" when it was released in London in 1888 and brought Couvreur immediate fame. In 1890 she published a short story collection titled A Sydney Sovereign and Other Tales, which consisted of stories that she had published in The Australasian over the preceding decade. She wrote another five novels, the majority of which were inspired by her marriage to Charles Fraser and depicted women who were mistreated by their cruel and villainous husbands.

=== Journalism and death ===
Following the death of her husband from stomach cancer in 1894, Couvreur took up his position as the Brussels correspondent for the newspaper The Times. She became one of only two senior female employees at the newspaper, alongside the colonial correspondent Flora Shaw. She published articles on a near-daily basis, largely on Belgian politics and the country's role in world affairs. Eventually her position was expanded to include covering the Netherlands. Her health began to decline; in 1896 she was diagnosed with anemia, and in July 1897 she suffered a heart attack. After several months of heart issues, Couvreur died in Brussels following a coronary thrombosis on 23 October 1897.

== Writing ==
In addition to her first novel Uncle Piper of Piper's Hill, Tasma wrote five novels, each depicting unhappy marriages in which women are mistreated by their alcoholic, cruel, dishonest, or weak husbands. The scholar Raymond Beilby describes Couvreur's writing as "somewhat pedantic in style and repetitive in structure", while praising her ability to capture the attitudes of the late nineteenth-century urban middle class. Beilby and Cecil Hadgraft write that while Uncle Piper showcased Couvreur's ability to explore Australian life, her later social novels and their autobiographical inspirations were less compelling. The literary scholar Margaret Harris argues that Couvreur's explorations of marriage should be read in the context of "New Woman" literature, and that Beilby's interpretation of her writing as essentially autobiographical is overly reductive.

Alongside the work of fellow novelists Ada Cambridge and Rosa Praed, Couvreur's writing was often dismissed or forgotten in the years following her death. Her focus on marriage and domestic life was seen as at odds with the bush-focused nationalist traditions that emerged in Australian literature. However, her writing has since been rediscovered by feminist scholars. Couvreur's novel Uncle Piper of Piper's Hill was reprinted in 1967, and she was the subject of a biography by Patricia Clarke in 1994.

== Bibliography ==
=== Novels and collection ===
- Uncle Piper of Piper's Hill (1888)
- In Her Earliest Youth (1890)
- The Penance of Portia James (1891)
- A Knight of the White Feather (1892)
- Not Counting the Cost (1895)
- A Fiery Ordeal (1897)

=== Short story collections ===
- A Sydney Sovereign (1890)
