= Merriville House and Gardens =

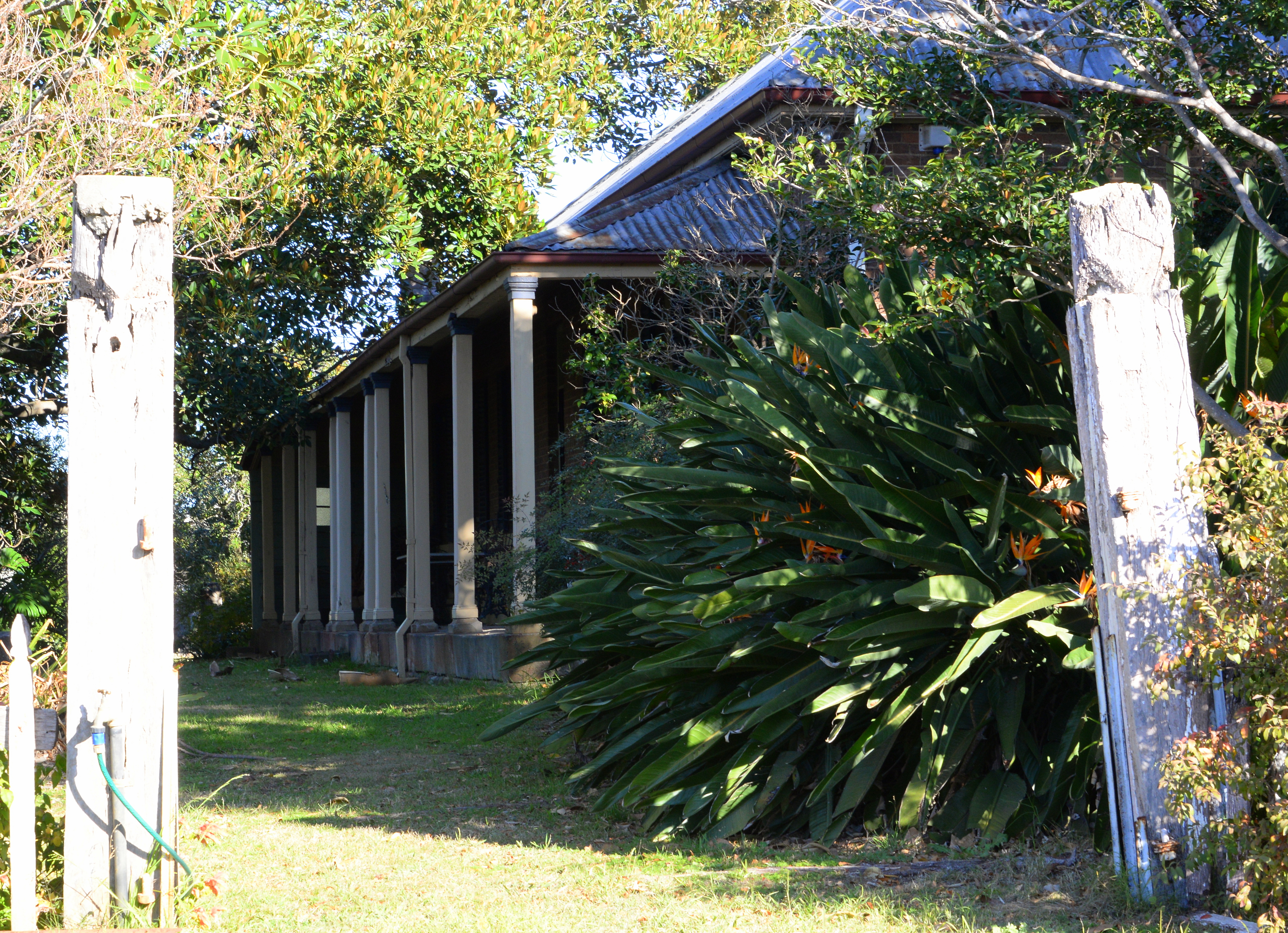
- Merriville House

- 49 Vinegar Hill Road, Kellyville Ridge NSW 2155 as well as 1 Eire Way, Kellyville Ridge NSW 2155
- 33°41′56″S 150°55′16″E
- Location: Kellyville Ridge, New South Wales, Australia

History
- Built: 1817–1855

Site notes
- Owner: Landcom; Mr Colin R Wade

New South Wales Heritage Register
- Official name: Merriville House & Gardens; Hambledon Cottage; Hambledon; Maryville
- Type: State heritage (complex / group)
- Designated: 2 April 1999
- Reference no.: 91
- Type: Homestead Complex
- Category: Farming and Grazing

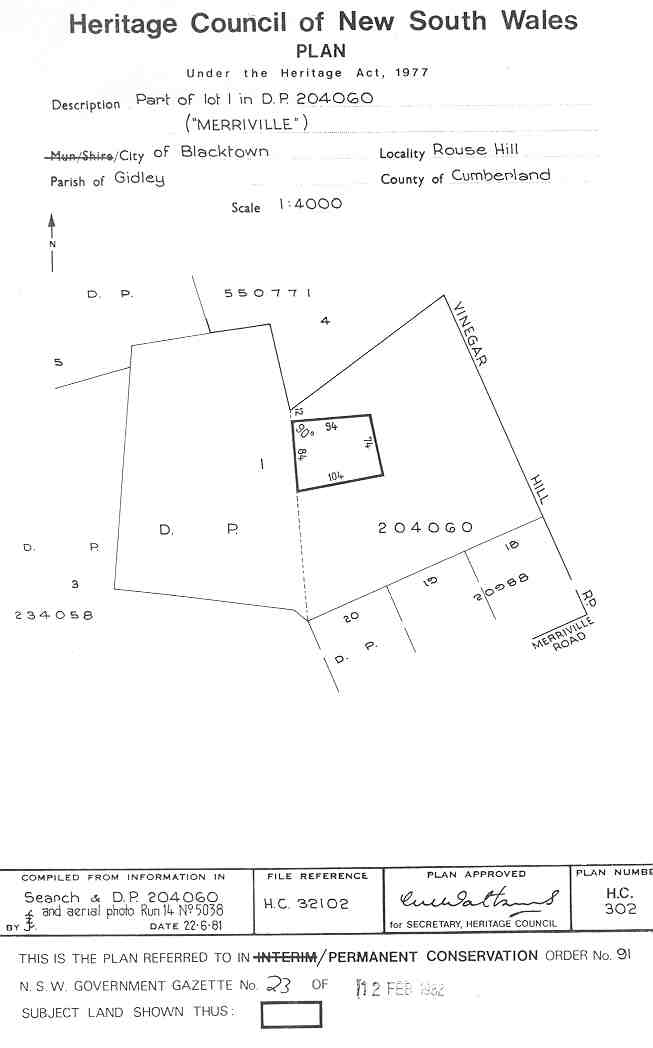
Merriville House property boundaries

Merriville House & Gardens is a heritage-listed residence at 1 Eire Way, Kellyville Ridge, New South Wales, or 49 Vinegar Hill Road, Kellyville Ridge NSW 2155, Australia. It was built from 1817 to 1855. It is also known as Hambledon Cottage, Hambledon and Maryville. It was added to the New South Wales State Heritage Register on 2 April 1999. The house was last sold in 2008 for $268,000.

== History ==
The Darug Aboriginal tribal members and their ancestors were custodians of the land as far as the eye could see, and beyond. The landscape was a natural woodland of grey box (Eucalyptus moluccana), forest red gum (E. tereticornis) and ironbark (E. crebra/paniculata) with an understorey of shrubbery and grasses heavily populated with local wildlife. She-oaks (Casuarina cunninghamiana) marked the banks of the watercourses flowing freely to the Hawkesbury River. A silcrete mine, a valuable trade commodity for this tribe, was a short walking distance westwards in the vicinity of the present day suburb of Schofields. Aboriginal sites have been identified nearby at Bella Vista (to Merriville's southeast).

=== General Kellyville (area) history ===
Matthew Pearce was the first settler to receive land at Seven Hills, having been granted around 160 acres in 1794-5. Pearce's property became known as 'King's Langley.' In 1799 a joint grant of 980 acres was made to Joseph Foveaux and Charles Grimes. Within a month Grimes signed over his share to Foveaux. The property was known as "Stock Farm" and adjoined Pearce's property.

Other smaller grants were made near Foveaux's land later in October 1799 with William Goodhall receiving 270 acres while 160 acres was granted to Richard Richardson. It was on Richardson's holding that the "Bella Vista" farm complex evolved. By 1801, Richardson had sold his entire grant to a Thomas Jones who sold it just under a year later to the well known Irish emancipist Richard Fitzgerald. Fitzgerald was also to acquire 170 acres of Goodhall's land.

Having been appointed Acting Lieutenant Governor at Norfolk Island, Foveaux found it necessary to sell his Toongabbie holdings and by December 1801 John and Elizabeth Macarthur had bought up Foveaux's "Stock Farm" along with all its livestock. Subsequently, Richard Fitzgerald, who acted as the Macarthur's steward, manager and record keeper during John's absence from the colony, sold his 330 acres holdings to the Macarthurs. This conglomerate of around 2270 acres was to become known as "Seven Hills Farm". It was here that Elizabeth Macarthur bred some of the first Merino sheep.

In 1821 the Macarthurs "Seven Hills Farm" was returned to Crown land in lieu of land at Camden (Camden Park Estate). Fresh grants of portions of the "Seven Hills Farm" were made almost immediately. James Robertson was granted 500 acres on which the present day "Bella Vista" is situated.

Other grantees included Matthew Pearce who was allotted 170 acres in 1835. Robertson grazed sheep and cattle on his property but found orcharding much more productive. The property was advertised for subdivision in 1838 but purchased outright by his neighbour, Isabella Acres in 1838. In 1842 Acres returned home to England which led to its sale to William Pearce.

Edward Pearce inherited the property upon the demise of his father, William. From this time on, major consolidation, expansion and property improvement were to see the evolution of the "Bella Vista" farm. Edward appears to have moved into his inheritance, "Robertson Farm." Though mixed farming continued, orchards were the dominant land usage on the property. By the 1880s Edward had established himself as one of the most successful orchardists on the central Cumberland Plain. In 1887 he grossed over 8500 pounds for citrus fruit shipped to Melbourne. His farming was based on capital and allowing him to employ at least 30 full-time workers. A substantial number were Chinese who had turned to agricultural labour once the goldfields had been exhausted.

The citrus fruit grown found good markets in Sydney, Melbourne and Tasmania. With the establishment of irrigation area along the Murray during the 1890s and later irrigation developments in South Australia and southern New South Wales, these markets were seriously eroded. The citrus being grown in the newer districts produced the navel orange which were much superior to the common orange variety. Thus around 1912, when Edward's son Edward ('Toby') Pearce inherited "Bella Vista", sheep were reintroduced there. By the early 1920s, Toby began removing sheep and orchards in preference for commercial dairying. Considerable expansion of the industry occurred, facilitated by the new introductions of exotic grasses and the rise of modern agricultural science in this period.

In 1884 a large subdivision of fifteen old grants created 100 acre lots. It was called the Kellyville Estate as much of it had been owned by Hugh Kelly, hence the modern suburb's name. Previously it had been known as Irishtown, a logical enough title since a large clan of the Kellys inhabited the area, and after Kelly's death disputed the apportionment of his land among them.

Hugh Kelly had a hotel on the Windsor Road known as the Bird-in-Hand where coaches made a refreshment stop. Another hotel further along this road, known as the White Hart Hotel, was owned by a man named Cross. Two other inns were run by John Hillas who received two grants on the present Old Windsor Road in 1802 and 1804. He farmed the land as well as operating the inns, the Stanhope Arms and the Nowhere Here - apparently this was the standard reply to authorities looking for people who had no business to be in the area.

=== Merriville Farm's history ===
Between 1788 and 1818 there was the occasional disturbance of the Aboriginals' normal seasonal movements by exploring settler parties, convict runaways, a small number of settlers, road makers, shingle cutters, timber getters and others pursuing specialised timbers for the growing settlements of Sydney Town, Parramatta and the Hawkesbury. Also a reserve was established for the government herds requiring large-scale clearing and fencing of an area close by.

==== The Bradley family and tenants 1818–1853 ====
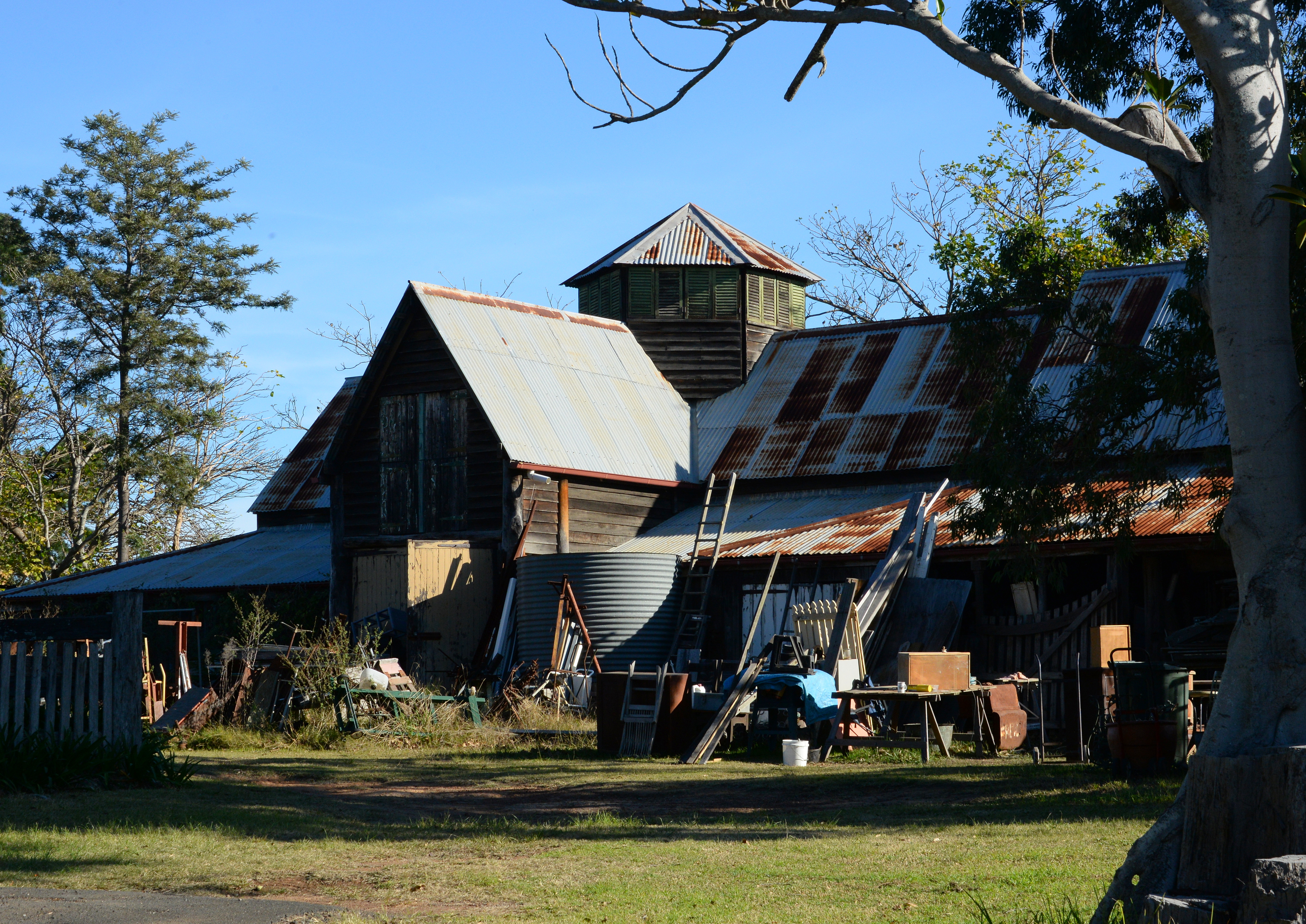
Building that was part of the original Jonas Bradley property, located behind Merriville House

Merriville House and the land surrounding it were first alienated for European purposes in 1818 as part of 250 acres granted to Jonas Bradley, a former sergeant in the New South Wales Corps. Jonas married Catherine, née Condon, an ex-convict. He was a successful farmer and a large landholder. He had commenced farming on the Hawkesbury at Freeman's Reach with a 25-acre grant and was sufficiently well-thought-of by Macquarie to receive new larger grants for himself and his sons. His two sons Thomas and William were also granted 70 and 60 acres of land adjoining this property. The family had already been working this property prior to 1818.

Ultimately the farms were amalgamated along with some land from an adjoining grant made to John Palmer in 1818. Bradley became an influential and well-known member of the local community. His property achieved fame as the place where tobacco was first successfully grown in the colony (by 1823 he was known for this and his methods were adopted for tobacco cultivation elsewhere in the colony.

Jonas Bradley added to his farm by buying 300 acres across the (Windsor) road, grants made in 1809 by Col. Paterson, surrendered and re-issued in 1/1810 by Macquarie. These bore the names of Lucy Mileham, Edward Robinson, Michael Robinson and Michael Hickson. About this time the small building made of hand-made bricks was erected and could at that time have been a stand-alone residence for a small family or convict overseer. The Sydney Gazette of 1823 noted that Bradley had upwards of 100 cattle and 800 sheep, and as having made an effective sheep dip to treat scabies using a tobacco derivative. This achievement was so impressive that he received further grants for himself and his sons (2000 acres for Jonas and 1000 acres each for William and Thomas) in the County of Argyle, where his son William is generally thought of as the father of Goulburn.

Although still listed as a farmer in the 1828 census, at some stage over the next five years Jonas Bradley moved to Goulburn. He may or may not have returned to Merriville by 1828). After their initial occupation the property appears to have been leased out for some years by the family although there is no evidence of the use or occupants during this time, possibly from the later 1820s, until its sale in 1853.

In 1835 Bradley's son Thomas died, leaving his farm to his father. On the death of Jonas Bradley in 1841, his surviving son William inherited the large landholding of 320 acres. William however, lived in Goulburn, and after 10 years of leasing the property he sold the total 380 acres to Elias Pearson Laycock. The total holding on the Windsor Road was then 680 acres.

William Bradley was a very successful farmer, grazier and entrepreneur. He married Emily Elizabeth Hovell in 1831, daughter of the explorer William Hovell, and seems to have lived mainly in Goulburn after that. They had eight children (2 sons, 6 daughters). His legacy is impressive: he is credited firstly with the founding of the inland city of Goulburn. He commissioned the building of the Bradley Grange (there), consisting of a Brewery, Malting works, flour mill, tobacco kiln and mews. Francis Greenway is said to have been its designer. As Old Goulburn Brewery, this stands today as the oldest industrial complex in Australia. William purchased the 300 acres on which Bradley Grange was built - in view of his home, Lansdowne Park. He gave wide support to the Agricultural Society of New South Wales and was one of the leading investors and proponents for extending the railway to the south, especially as far as Goulburn. He was a member of the Parliament of New South Wales, a friend of many important men of the day and a founding member of the Union Club, which he used as a bolt hole in Sydney if at the time his house was leased out. He became a friend and benefactor of Caroline Chisholm and her support of women emigrants. He, the son of a convict mother, left 100,000 pounds. His success with farming was said to be because he supervised his properties himself. In 1847 he claimed to own 40,000 sheep and 14 leaseholds. By the 1860s he owned 51,000 sheep and 23 leaseholds or stations centred on the Monaro district. He owned the property Lindesay in Darling Point from 1849 until his death in 1868. He was survived by 5 daughters, only one of whom, Alice, remained in Australia.

==== Elias Laycock: 1853–1866 ====
The new owner was Elias Pearson Laycock, a person for whom there is little evidence to document his life and activities. Elias was grandson of Quarter Master Thomas Laycock. Thomas Laycock Jr. married twice. He married Margaret Mary, née Connell, daughter of a Sydney merchant, in 1817., Margaret was Elias' mother. Elias married Grace Lysaght, née Longfield, daughter of Dean (Rev.) John Longfield and Mary, née Cotter. John Longfield came to Australia from County Cork, Ireland with his second wife. The family estate was called "Longeville". The Longfields claim Norman blood and ducal connections.

The name "Maryville" for the 680 acres on the Windsor Road can be traced to the property from this time, perhaps reflecting the name of Grace's mother, Mary Longfield. Good evidence, both physical and anecdotal, can be found for the presence of the house as we known it today, including the kitchen/dairy/servant block. An oral tradition records Elias as quite wealthy, even though he was not the eldest son of Captain Thomas Laycock. He may have increased his wealth on his marriage to Grace, or may have inherited money from the Laycocks or Connells. In 1858 Grace's brother, John Longfield, aged 37, gentleman, was resident at Maryville when he married Elizabeth Mary, née Drane, aged 28, at St. Matthew's Church of England, Windsor. Elias and Grace Laycock were the witnesses. It is likely though that he was responsible for the construction of the present Merriville House, probably in the mid-later 1850s, apparently built partly over the site of the original (1818) house. Laycock sold his property in 1866 to Robert Pearce.

By 1860, with the arrival of the Main Western railway line to Blacktown, 158 settlers resided in the area occupying only 27 houses. As the population began to expand in the area, Laycock decided to sell in 1866 to Robert Pearce for 2750 pounds.

==== The Pearce family: 1866–1955 ====
The Pearces were one of the most influential families in the district and amongst the largest landholders. They were descendants of Matthew Pearce, possibly the first settler in the Parramatta area and builder of his home 'King's Langley' (Bella Vista) in 1794-5. They were renowned orchardists and it is probable that some of the Merriville property was put to this use although there is little documentary evidence for the management of the place. It is also probable that the family was responsible for substantial additions made to Merriville House.

It was about this time that the large weatherboard building was attached to the large brick building already on the property. The room moved from Hambledon is said to be the schoolroom in which the Rev. Wilkinson took lessons.

Robert expanded his estate in 1873 by acquiring the adjoining land (1500 acres) known as "Hambledon" which had been granted to Commissary John Palmer in 1818 (Palmer had died in 1833 ). Between 1873 and 1914 he sold Hambledon and retained the original Palmer grant. This subdivision may have occurred in 1890, when Pearce, at the same time, acquired other neighbouring land - that which had been granted to Campbell in 1818.

Pearce died in 1914 and his wife Euphemia Jessie (née Hillas) inherited Merriville, which she leased to her son Albert. The Hillas family were early grantees in the Kellyville area, previously owning land adjoining the Pearce family properties, actually at the corner of Old Windsor Road and Windsor Road, the property known as "Stanhope Farm". The Hillas family were wealthy also with the Drinkwater grandchildren inheriting multiple properties in Kent Street, Sydney, cottages in Parramatta, houses in Hobart and a small farm, previously part of Bligh's Copenhagen Estate, at Rouse Hill. Robert and Euphemia like most of the Pearces had a large family of 11 children, four of whom were sons. One daughter died, aged 12.

Albert Charles Hillas ("Charlie") Pearce subdivided the property and used the remaining land for grazing. While Robert and Euphemia may have planted orchards, according to Cultural Resource Management P/L the area close to the house was used for grazing. There are a few remnants of timber buildings used for the animals and fencing, mainly in the existing public reserve.

Eupehmia Pearce retained the property until her death in 1922. It was then acquired by Charles ('Charlie') Hillas Pearce, "grazier" in 1924. During the early years of the 20th century he used the land for grazing. As shown in 1940s aerial photographs, a series of fenced paddocks with timber stock buildings were located to the south-west of the Merriville Homestead. Albert then subdivided the property in 1949 and used the remaining land for grazing. When Charlie Pearce died in 1952 and the property passed to his widow Ellen. Charlie Pearce had from 1949 been selling off parts of his property as farming had become economically unsustainable. Ellen continued to subdivide the land. Merriville was sold in 1955.

==== The Scharkie family: 1955–later 1980s ====
The new owner, Charles Scharkie, at the time of his purchase, also bought the nearby property of Mungerie Park [now within the Rouse Hill Town Centre (and in the Kellyville Country Club Golf Course - Warren, 2008, 2)]. Sharkie was a former Mayor of Manly. This was successfully run as a dairy for several years.

The house was said to be run down at the time and some building work was done on the house and outbuildings. Charles' son Ian Scharkie and his wife Janne came to live at Maryville and Ian went into partnership with several enterprises with his brother Robert )'Bob'), who had purchased the Mungerie (Park) property. Bob Scharkie was a graduate of the Hawkesbury Agricultural College at Richmond and purchased the property "Mungerie" of c.430 acres, always calling it "Mungerie Park", and in 1959 he had the house freshly painted for his bride, Joan. Bob firstly ran a dairy called "Mungerie Park Dairy" which closed in 1969 and during this time, he also ran a transport business from the property. Later he and Ian created Mungerie Park Golf Course which in time became very successful, and was later leased to the Australian Postal Institute, becoming the Kellyville Country Club Golf Course.

Ian Scharkie inherited Maryville from his father. The family's two properties then totalled 1800 acres. When Merriville passed out of the family's hands it was a mere 40 acres.

There was a misunderstanding by the Scharkie family about the original name "Maryville", and they called it "Merriville". The huge costs associated with the holding of a large parcel of mostly unproductive land resulted in the sale of much of it over the coming years. The Castlebrook Lawn Cemetery bought one large parcel of 300 acres and there were many other 5 acre parcels hived off, including the land for the James Ruse Hotel/Motel, now occupied by the "Ettamogah Pub". Vinegar Hill Road was gazetted in 1958 and Merriville Road probably about the same time, changing the original entrance to Merriville from Windsor Road. Merriville's core, however still retained most of its ancillary outbuildings, a smithy, stables, hayloft, killing yards and small huts used for workmen and, in an earlier age, for assigned convicts. Janne's mother lived at Merriville also and was well known for her green thumb (i.e. her garden). The bones of that early garden, dating back to possibly the Laycock family, are still in evidence today. Merriville appears to have been mainly used as the family home and many changes were made to the house for this purpose.

In 1958-9 Scharkie subdivided the land leaving 30 to 40 acres around the house. The house and land was inherited by Ian Scharkie in 1969, representing an end to the farming era of the property.

==== Recent history ====
Merriville was classified by the National Trust of Australia (NSW) and a permanent conservation order was placed on it by the Heritage Council of NSW in 1982. Between 1982 and 1987, exterior shots of the property and grounds featured regularly in the Australian television serial Sons and Daughters. Merriville House was known in the serial as Woombai, the country homestead owned by the Hamilton family.

Janne, widow of Ian Scharkie, sold the estate to Housing NSW. The house and approximately 200 acres was separated out by Landcom and purchased by the current owners. Landcom purchased Merriville in the late 1980s and soon sold it to the present owners in 1993.

Landcom also purchased the land surrounding the house and during the later 1990s subdivisions for residential development began to occupy all the land that had formerly belonged to Merriville farm. The subdivision completed the transformation of this estate from farmland to suburban allotments.

The initial interim conservation order area was much larger than the permanent conservation area (PCO), being 31 acres as opposed to 2 acres. This was due to the presence on the western side of the lot of a number of slab outbuildings of greater age than the homestead and to its address to and views to and from Vinegar Hill Road and Old Windsor Road. Merriville's address now is 1 Eire Way, Kellyville Ridge (no longer 'The Windsor Road' or 'Vinegar Hill Road').

Due to the deterioration of these slab structures between initial and final listings and thus the difficulty of ensuring their conservation, it was decided to reduce the curtilage listed to approximately 2 acres being the immediate garden area. No other assessment appeared to have occurred on the heritage significance of the landscape setting or other elements of the former farm such as fencelines, field patterns, plantings or views.

Related elements of Merriville's heritage significance, such as the original farm carriage driveway and farm pump, are located outside the State Heritage Register curtilage and may have been under threat from a recent subdivision.

== Description ==
=== Setting and garden ===
Related elements of Merriville's heritage significance, such as the original farm carriage driveway and farm pump, are located outside the State Heritage Register curtilage and may have been under threat from a recent subdivision.

The land encompassed by the present allotment for Merriville House and the reserved public land behind probably preserve the sites of the most substantial buildings associated with the domestic occupation of both the earlier and mid-nineteenth century houses.

However, it is almost certain that the land surrounding these two blocks and including the proposed subdivision encompasses structures and other features that relate to both the nineteenth and twentieth century history of this property. A few of those sites could still be seen in 2001.

Since that time these have either been subsumed by other residential development or have been removed and the land left vacant. Apart from the removal of the structures above ground on the remaining vacant land there does not appear to have been any sub-surface disturbance and if anything is within the ground it is likely to have been largely undisturbed since it was deposited there.

=== Merriville Rise Reserve ===
This area of open space immediately west of Merriville House contains a collection of remnant outbuildings, (new, replacement/reinstated) split log fences, a stock/sheep ramp, a wool press, two cisterns and one mature indigenous tree, which appears to be an ironbark (Eucalyptus paniculata). Beyond the once extensive pastures have been subdivided for housing. Additional rural style elements have been added as site interpretation and artworks, including "sheep", a windmill structure, "notional" water tanks and yards outlined by fencing and sections of corrugated iron.

=== Garden ===
The house is surrounded by a mature rural homestead garden, dominated by several large Moreton Bay fig trees (Ficus macrophylla). A large shelter belt on the western boundary is lined with coral trees (likely Erythrina x sykesii). Other trees marking the garden include Peruvian pepper (corn) tree (Schinus molle), rough-barked apple (Angophora floribunda). Major shrub plantings include oleander (Nerium oleander), cotoneaster (C.sp.), giant bamboo (Bambusa balcooa), a hedge of Photinia robusta cv., may bush (Spiraea cantonensis) used as extensive hedging, box (Buxus sempervirens) similarly used as hedging at a lower level closer to the house's front, variegated century plants (Agave americana 'Variegata'), large old Camellia japonica cv.s and two large climbing Bougainvillea glabra cv. on the rear, western fence.

=== House ===
The fine brick house has a long front verandah and a rear verandah, cedar joinery and twelve-paned shuttered windows, with a timber annex at one end. Set on the rise above the Windsor Road, it is framed by large Port Jackson figs (Ficus rubiginosa) and a stand of bamboo which are contemporary with the mid-nineeth century house.".

A single storey late colonial Georgian house with verandahs front and rear. The timber annex at one end is said to have been built prior to 1831 as a school, with the Reverend Wilkinson having conducted a school there in 1831. The land, with an area of 1, 500 acres, was originally granted to John Palmer. The main roof is of hipped iron having three equal hips at the rear and covered way to a two-storey section. The verandah pavings and floor of the cottage are 12 x 12 inch brick tiles stamped W. Hancock & Co., Parramatta. The verandah roof is supported on elegant rectangular timber columns with raised front panels sitting on stone plinths. The house has walls of sandstone brick and stone foundations, later sandstone, on verandah paving.

The site of the mid-nineteenth century Merriville House is almost certainly the site of the early nineteenth century Bradley House. One intact building from this phase stands behind the present house.

=== Outbuilding/kitchen ===
The rear kitchen cottage has a jerkin-head roof. A two-storey brick kitchen cottage at the rear may have been Hambledon Cottage, its jerkin head form and traces of early joinery indicate that it probably predates the main house.

Due to the deterioration of these slab structures between initial and final listings and thus the difficulty of ensuring their conservation, it was decided to reduce the curtilage listed to approximately 2 acres being the immediate garden area. No other assessment appeared to have occurred on the heritage significance of the landscape setting or other elements of the former farm such as fencelines, field patterns, plantings or views.

=== Garden ===
The garden is well-tended and planted with vines, shrubs and trees of historic relevance, much remnant plantings still remaining, including the signature Moreton Bay fig trees (Ficus macrophylla). The elevated water tank stands with a birds-eye view of the area, reminding us that reticulated water is a very new reality in this area, and in Merriville's case, 2005.

=== Condition ===
As at 7 September 2010: The site of the mid-nineteenth century Merriville House is almost certainly the site of the early nineteenth century Bradley House. One intact building from this phase stands behind the present house. The land encompassed by the present allotment for Merriville House and the reserved public land behind probably preserve the sites of the most substantial buildings associated with the domestic occupation of both the earlier and mid-nineteenth century houses.

However, it is almost certain that the land surrounding these two blocks and including the proposed subdivision encompasses structures and other features that relate to both the nineteenth and twentieth century history of this property. A few of those sites could still be seen in 2001. Since that time these have either been subsumed by other residential development or have been removed and the land left vacant. Apart from the removal of the structures above ground on the remaining vacant land there does not appear to have been any sub-surface disturbance and if anything is within the ground it is likely to have been largely undisturbed since it was deposited there.

In short, and specifically with respect to the potential archaeological resource, Merriville House and its grounds are (and were) a highly, significant nineteenth century property. The ability of the place to demonstrate its former use has been compromised by the loss of the landscape that gave its rural context. Archaeological evidence that may be unearthed during the development process is likely to specifically address this agricultural and pastoral context as well as more adequately define the management of this important place in the past. This has added importance taking into account the almost complete absence of primary archival records to provide evidence for occupation and development throughout the entire history of Merriville.

Comprehensive research undertaken for the Heritage Assessment of 2001 revealed that this is a very poorly documented site with respect to primary archival evidence. Sufficient survives from land titles and occasional references in sources such as newspapers to provide the overview described in the preceding section but, for almost its entire history, this is a largely invisible site.

The absence of surveys and other reliable archival guides makes it almost impossible to define specific archaeological targets. For example, with respect to the earliest period of occupation, the site of the house and at least one out-building close to it can be determined from extant physical evidence (within the grounds of Merriville House) but it is absolutely certain that the farm and tobacco crops established by the Bradley family must have required many other buildings. A Sydney Gazette description of the crop in 1823 refers to "airy drying sheds" but there is no possible way now to identify the site of those sheds or any other out-buildings.

This is true of almost all periods of occupation on this site. The only exception is from the early years of the twentieth century when the land was used for grazing. Aerial photographs beginning in the 1940s show a series of fenced paddocks with timber stock buildings in each located to the south-west of Merriville House. When the site was surveyed in 2001 a few remnant fences and parts of those buildings remained there. These have since been removed with the exception of a few fragments in the reserved public land behind Merriville House.

So it may be concluded that the development area may and is even likely to contain archaeological evidence from any or all of the phases of occupation associated with Merriville House but there is insufficient archival evidence to provide specific targets for prior investigation or care during monitoring. There is also insufficient physical evidence for this purpose.

The proposed archaeological method — monitoring of earthworks with the recording of any visible remains to Heritage Office standards and testing sealed deposits for dateable or environmental samples when relevant, is appropriate to the significance of the resource and the research questions.

=== Modifications and dates ===
- Circa 1817: Hambledon Cottage
- Circa 1831: Timber annex
- Circa 1855: Main house

== Heritage listing ==
Merrivlle House and environs have state significance because of the rarity of the early-mid nineteenth century fabric found there. The place and its landscape contribute to documenting an evolving Australian identity and rural life-style. Both the early nineteenth century kitchen/dairy and the mid-nineteenth century Merriville House are largely intact, although modified, and both are rare and very good examples of Colonial Georgian and Victorian Georgian architecture. The garden and drive, too, are likely to reflect early nineteenth century planning and boundaries. The siting of the house on the hill demonstrates early Colonial practice and now, with the mature vegetation that surrounds it, provides a strong visual landmark. The place is comparable to the nearby Rouse Hill House although Merriville offers a different scale of prosperity and alternate social histories. Thus it provides a good comparative and possibly more representative example of nineteenth century rural life.

"Merriville House and its environs have regional and local significance for the historical associations of its principal occupants and their contribution to local development. The property had its beginnings in a seminal period of regional development and it has associations with an important, influential and respected early nineteenth century settler, Jonas Bradley. Bradley was independently important for his contribution to the development of early agricultural practices in the settlement. This place, on some part of his property, was the site of the first successful tobacco crop in the country and became a model for its cultivation elsewhere.

Merriville House and its environs illustrate the principal influences and events that shaped the area in the nineteenth and twentieth centuries. It has long-standing associations with the Pearce family, who operated commercial orchards in the Hills district and beyond. Robert Pearce and his descendants were associated with this house and land for approximately one hundred years. At one time, the Pearce family was the largest landholder in the district and owned multiple properties in the area.

"Merriville House and environs contain substantial elements of the first and all subsequent periods of occupation and this fabric describes the long and diverse residential and commercial history of the place and provides regional historical landmarks. It reflects the impact of changing economies and the closer incorporation of this once rural area into the suburban metropolitan area. This is achieved through open paddocks, the house group and the remnant farm structures and fencing.

"The fabric of the building and the landscape and the potential archaeological resource contains information that may help to more accurately define the specific history of occupation, use and development of this place as well as contribute to a greater knowledge of issues such as colonial agriculture and farm management, landscape design, architecture and building, particularly local varieties and supplies. It is one of a relatively small number of sites which have this potential most particularly for the early-mid nineteenth century period of occupation".

Merriville House & Gardens was listed on the New South Wales State Heritage Register on 2 April 1999.
