= Aussie World =

Theme park on the Sunshine Coast, Queensland, Australia

- Interactive map of Aussie World
- Location: Sunshine Coast, Queensland, Australia
- Coordinates: 26°45′0.78″S 153°2′47.65″E
- Opened: 24 November 1989
- General manager: Aaron Flanagan (COO)
- Slogan: Unreal, No Worries
- Operating season: Year-round

Attractions
- Total: 30
- Roller coasters: 1
- Water rides: 1
- Website: www.aussieworld.com.au

Aussie World is a privately owned, medium-sized, family theme park on the Sunshine Coast, Queensland, Australia. It has over 30 rides and attractions.

It is located at 1 Downunder Drive, just off the Bruce Highway at Palmview.

It has been recognised by the Sunshine Coast Council annual business awards as an important tourist attraction from 2011 to 2014. It was opened on 24 November 1989 and is open all year excepting Christmas Day and ANZAC Day.

== History and development ==
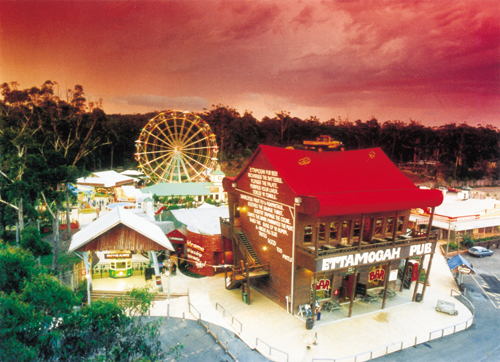
The now closed Ettamogah Pub with Aussie World in the background.

=== Park history ===
In 2005, Aussie World renovated their existing rides including the Wild Mouse Roller Coaster, Octopus and Rock 'n' Roll Rebel Dark Ride. Further renovations were conducted in 2007 with the front entrance being completely upgraded. Two 15.5-metre (51 ft), brightly coloured barber poles were erected and a twin-peaked blue and yellow shade across the entrance was constructed.

On 7 March 2011, Aussie World announced that they would open two new rides. The first was a Zamperla Disk'O called the Redback with the second being a Log Ride attraction due to open by the end of the year. The Redback opened on 1 April 2011 in time for the Easter school holidays. On 9 May 2011, Aussie World announced a further two rides would be constructed in 2011, totalling three for the year. The Giant Slide opened in September 2011. On 7 December 2011, the Plunge water ride was opened to the public. The three 2011 attractions cost a total of $2 million to construct. The introduction of these three rides has seen record attendance at the amusement park.

Aussie World formerly contained the landmark Ettamogah Pub. However this was closed and converted into the current 'The Pub at Aussie World' in 2017, with works completed in mid 2018.

=== Wet'n'Wild Aussie World ===
In May 2008, Village Roadshow Theme Parks (the owners of several Australian theme parks) entered into a conditional agreement with Aussie World. This agreement gave Village Roadshow the "option to acquire the land and business of Aussie World". The company planned to build a new Wet'n'Wild water park on the Aussie World site named Wet'n'Wild Aussie World. This was followed three months later with a development application being submitted to the Caloundra City Council.

On 23 September 2009, Village Roadshow Limited (VRL) announced "after extensive research, review and planning, VRL considers that when compared with other opportunities available, the potential returns do not justify the level of investment for the world class water park which would be required to deliver a significant destination site."

== Attractions ==
Aussie World has a collection of over 30 rides and attractions which provide entertainment for all ages. These include:

- The Wasp – An Airborne Shot 10 swinging chair ride by SBF Visa. Each pair of seats is equipped with a joystick that allows riders to increase the amount of outwards swing.
- The Illusionarium – Guests wander through several rooms themed to different dimensions. The attraction makes extensive use of mirrors, lighting, sound and forced perspective
- Mayhem Maze – Horror walkthrough attraction with a haunted carnival theme.
- Ballroom Blitz – Wave swinger ride, where guests sit in seats suspended from chains. The ride rises up, and rotates whilst moving in an undulating motion, and the seats swing outwards.
- Speed Stars – self-driven cars
- Booma Zooma – Chairswing type ride. Guests sit in individual seats suspended from the canopy by chains. As the ride rotates the chairs swing out
- Carousel – a restored 1927 carousel
- Crazy Mirrors – a series of mirrors that distort reflection
- Dingo Racer – a spinning coaster from Reverchon
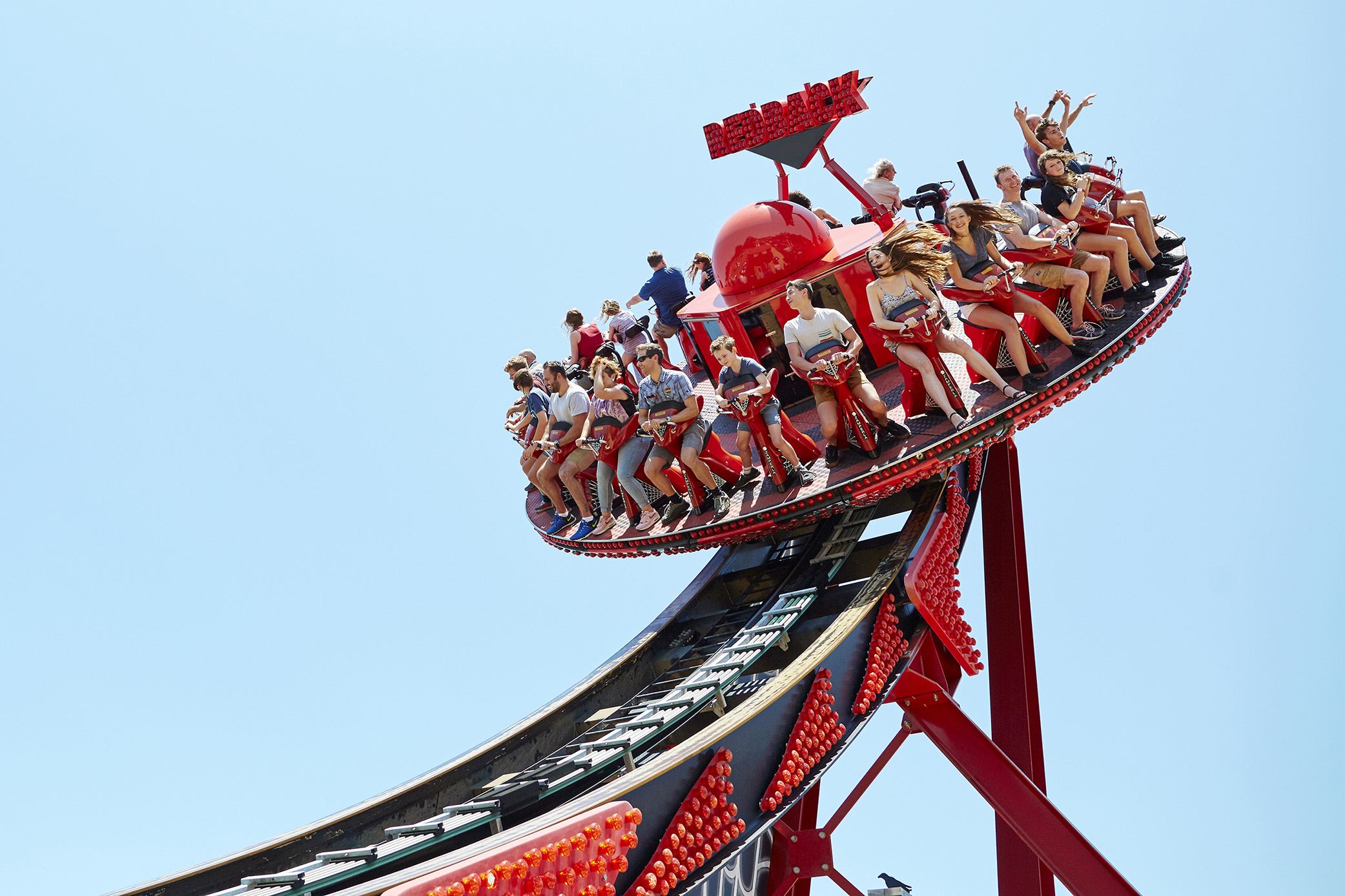
- Ferris Wheel – a Ferris wheel from the 1960s
- Giant Slide – Multi lane 46-metre (151 ft) mat slide.
- Giggle Go Round – a miniature carousel
- Leak'n Logs – Water play area with small tipping buckets, water curtains and a shed which simulates being in a thunderstorm.
- Mozzi Musta – a Tilt-A-Whirl style carnival ride.
- Platypus Ponds Mini Golf – Extensively landscaped 18 hole mini golf course
- Redback – a Zamperla Disk'O. Guests ride on a disk-shaped platform, on seats arranged around the edge, facing outwards. The disk is on an undercarriage and scoots back and forth along a shallow, U-shaped track, whilst spinning.
- Dizzy Turners Retro Rocket – A spinning ride set inside a disco-themed building, with classic rock n roll music combined with lighting. Guests ride in a chain of wagons that follow an undulating circular track. The ride rotates both backwards and forwards.
- Side Show Alley – a variety of upcharge attraction carnival games
- Space Shaker – Small spacecraft-themed swinging ship. The ride was relocated from "Tops" at the Myer Centre Brisbane.
- Stockshed Speedway Dodgems – a set of bumper cars
- SX 360 – Guests sit in an outward-facing ring of seats suspended from a pendulum. The pendulum is able to swing through a full 360 degrees whilst the ring of seats rotates.
- The Plunge – a log flume water ride
- Tin Lid's Tea Party – a teacups ride
- Little Beaut... Toot Toot! – Garishly coloured miniature train which replaced the self-propelled ride Tikes Trolley.
- Bombora Bounce – A drop tower ride where guests sit on a small ring of seats facing outwards. The ride lifts guests 10 metres into the air then drops them part way back down until it lifts guests back up again. The ride repeats this multiple times while also alternating between spinning clockwise and anti-clockwise.
- Bug Run – A fantasy garden themed rollercoaster designed for younger kids.
