= Palmview, Queensland =

Palmview
- Suburb
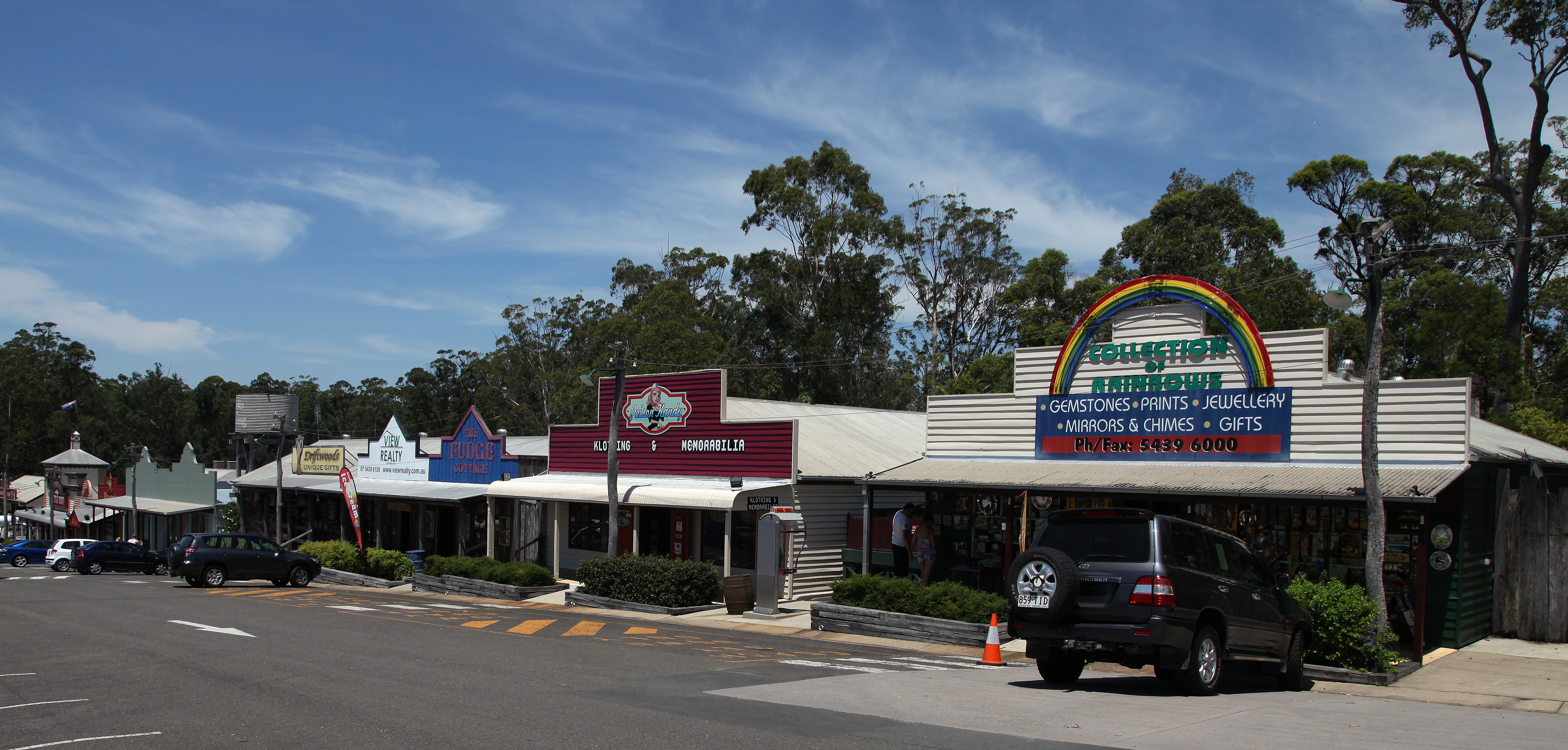
- Aussie World, 2013

- Interactive map of Palmview
- Coordinates: 26.7486°S 153.0655°E
- Country: Australia
- State: Queensland
- City: Sunshine Coast
- LGA: Sunshine Coast Region
- Location: 21.7 km (13.5 mi) NW of Caloundra; 21.9 km (13.6 mi) SE of Nambour; 108 km (67 mi) N of Brisbane

Government
  - State electorates: Buderim; Caloundra
  - Federal division: Fisher

Area
  - Total: 18.6 km^{2} (7.2 sq mi)

Population
  - Total: 5,236 (2021 census)
  - Density: 281.5/km^{2} (729.1/sq mi)
- Time zone: UTC+10:00 (AEST)
- Postcode: 4553
Suburbs around Palmview
| Tanawha | Sippy Downs | Birtinya |
| Glenview | Palmview | Meridan Plains |
| Glenview | Meridan Plains | Meridan Plains |

Palmview is a locality in the Sunshine Coast Region, Queensland, Australia. Although historically rural, it is becoming increasingly suburban. It is home to Aussie World. In the 2021 census, Palmview had a population of 5,236 people.

== Geography ==
The Bruce Highway enters the locality from the south-west (Glenview / Meridan Plains) and exits to the north-west (Tanawha / Sippy Downs).

There is rural residential housing in the south-west of the locality with other areas in the west of locality currently undeveloped. There is denser suburban housing in the north-east of the locality with the other areas in the east of locality predominantly used for grazing on native vegetation.

== History ==
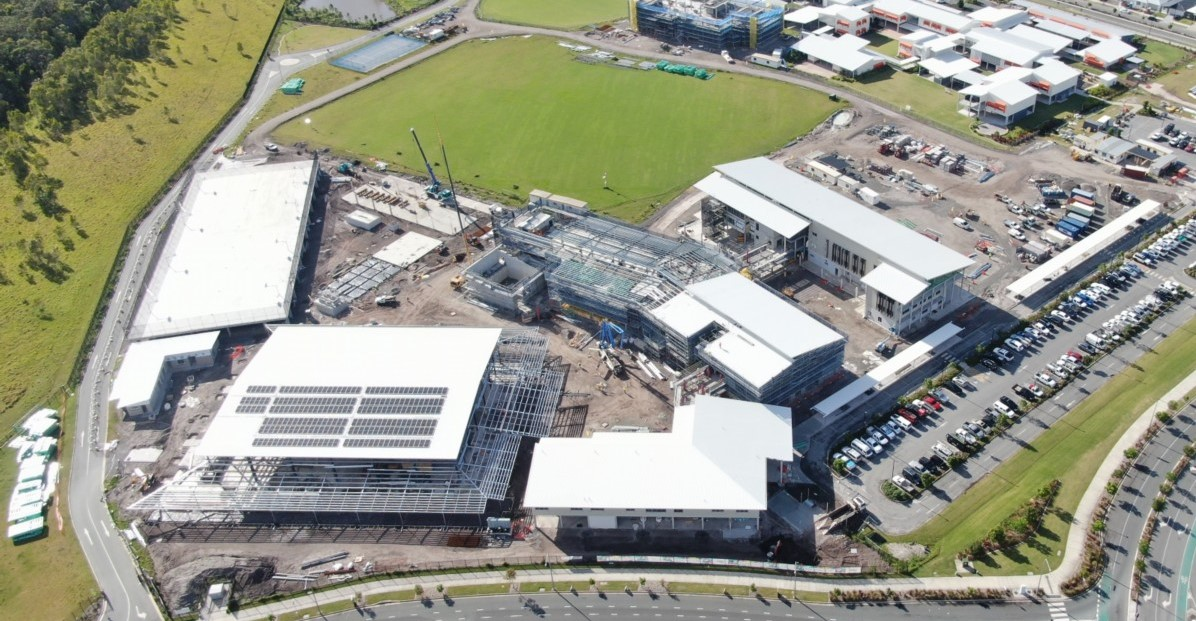
Palmview State Secondary College, under construction late October 2022

Palmview is situated in the Gubbi Gubbi (Kabi) traditional Aboriginal country.

With a history of logging and farming, the Palmview area had evolved with small acreage properties to the west of the Bruce Highway and the master-planned Harmony suburban development to east.

Construction of Palmview State Primary School commenced in 2020 and cost $63.8 million. The school opened on 27 January 2021 offering Years Prep to 6. It had an initial enrolment of 201 students with principal Andrew Walker.

Palmview State Special School, adjacent to the primary school, also commenced construction in 2020 and opened in January 2021.

Palmview State Secondary College opened in Term 1, 2023, accepting enrolments for students in Years 7 and 8, adding an additional school year each until all Years 7 to 12 are available in 2027.

== Demographics ==
In the 2016 census, Palmview had a population of 893 people.

In the 2021 census, Palmview had a population of 5,236 people.

== Education ==
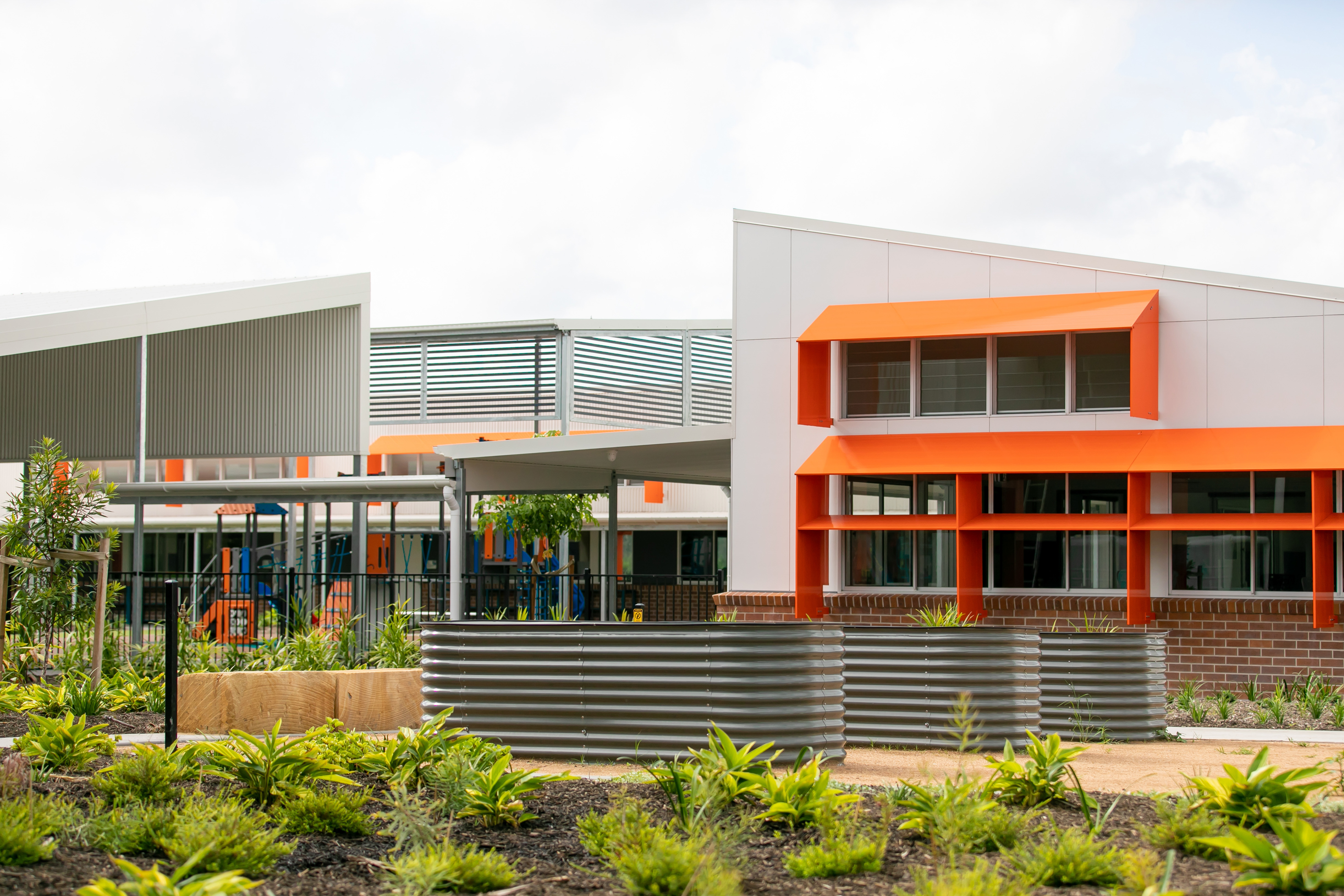
Palmview State Primary School, 2021

Palmview State Primary School is a government primary (P–6) school for boys and girls at 31 College Drive (26.7419°S 153.0713°E). In 2022, the school had an enrolment of 360 students with 30 teachers (26 full-time equivalent) and 19 non-teaching staff (14 full-time equivalent).

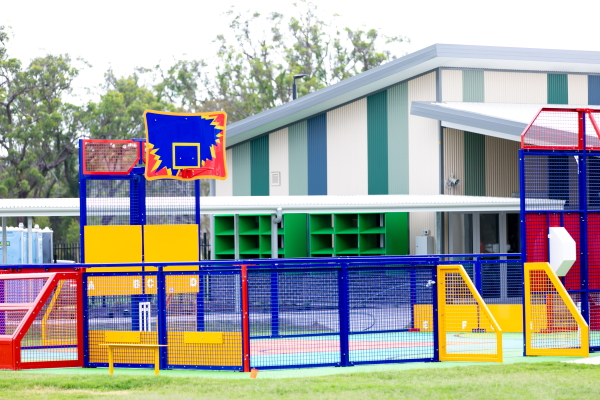
Palmview State Special School, 2021

Palmview State Special School is a government special education primary and secondary (P–12) school or boys and girls at 49 College Drive (26.7424°S 153.0736°E). In 2022, the school had an enrolment of 56 students with 18 teachers (16 full-time equivalent) and 25 non-teaching staff (14 full-time equivalent).

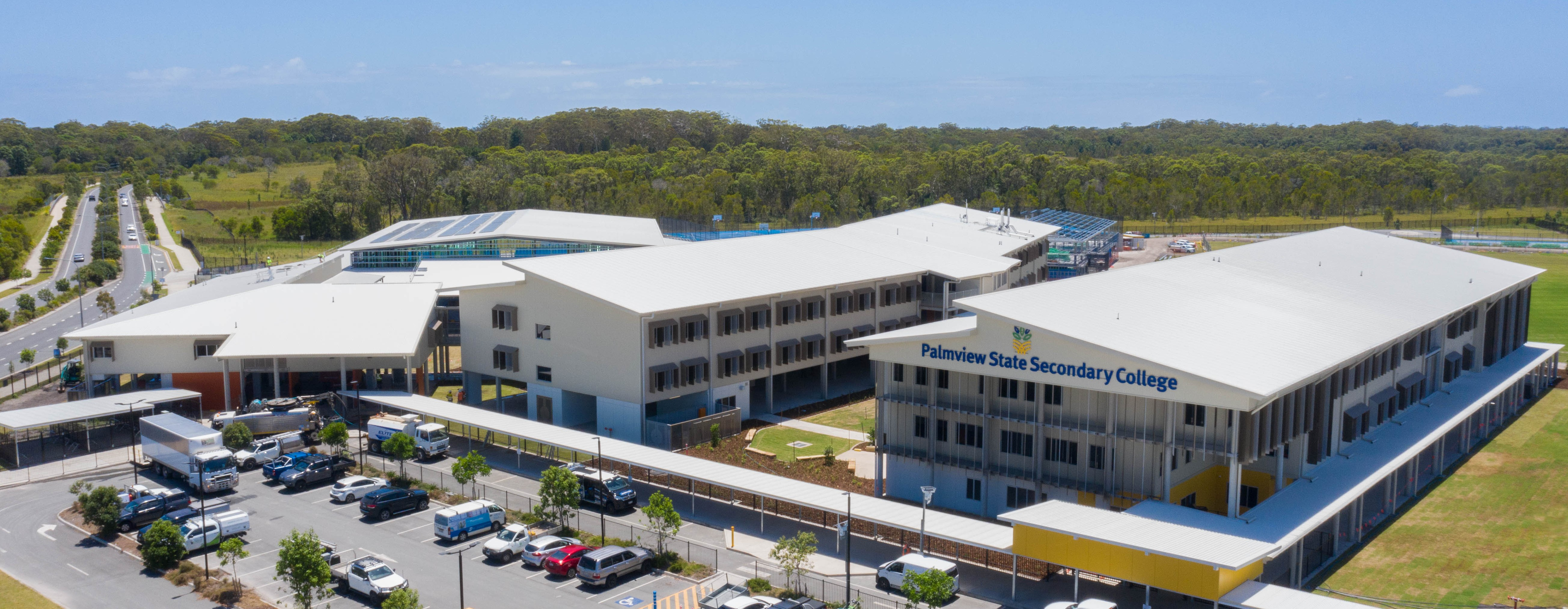
Palmview State Secondary College, at opening, January 2023

Palmview State Secondary College is a government secondary school for boys and girls at 17 Village Green Boulevard (26.7399°S 153.0703°E). Its first annual report will be published in 2024.

As at 2024, Palmview State Secondary College is offering only Years 7 to 9 with the full Years 7 to 12 being available from 2027. Prior to 2027, for secondary school to Year 12, the nearest government secondary schools are Chancellor State College in neighbouring Sippy Downs to the north and Meridan State College in neighbouring Meridan Plains to the south.

Although the three schools occupy separate sites, they are adjacent to one another.

== Attractions ==
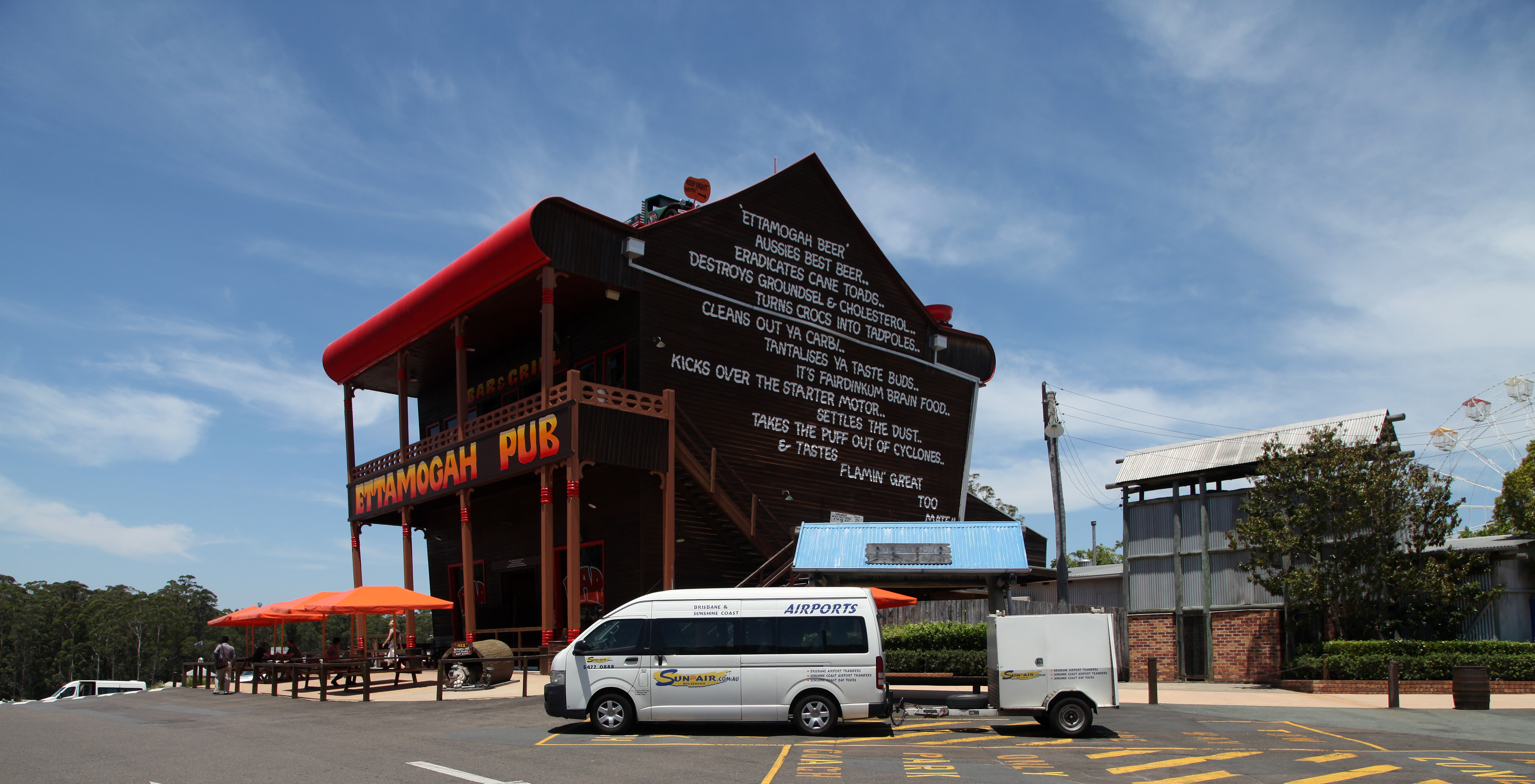
Aussie World & The Ettamogah Pub

Aussie World and the Ettamogah Pub are tourist attractions at 1 Downunder Driver (just off the Bruce Highway, 26.7502°S 153.0466°E).
