= Ettamogah Pub =

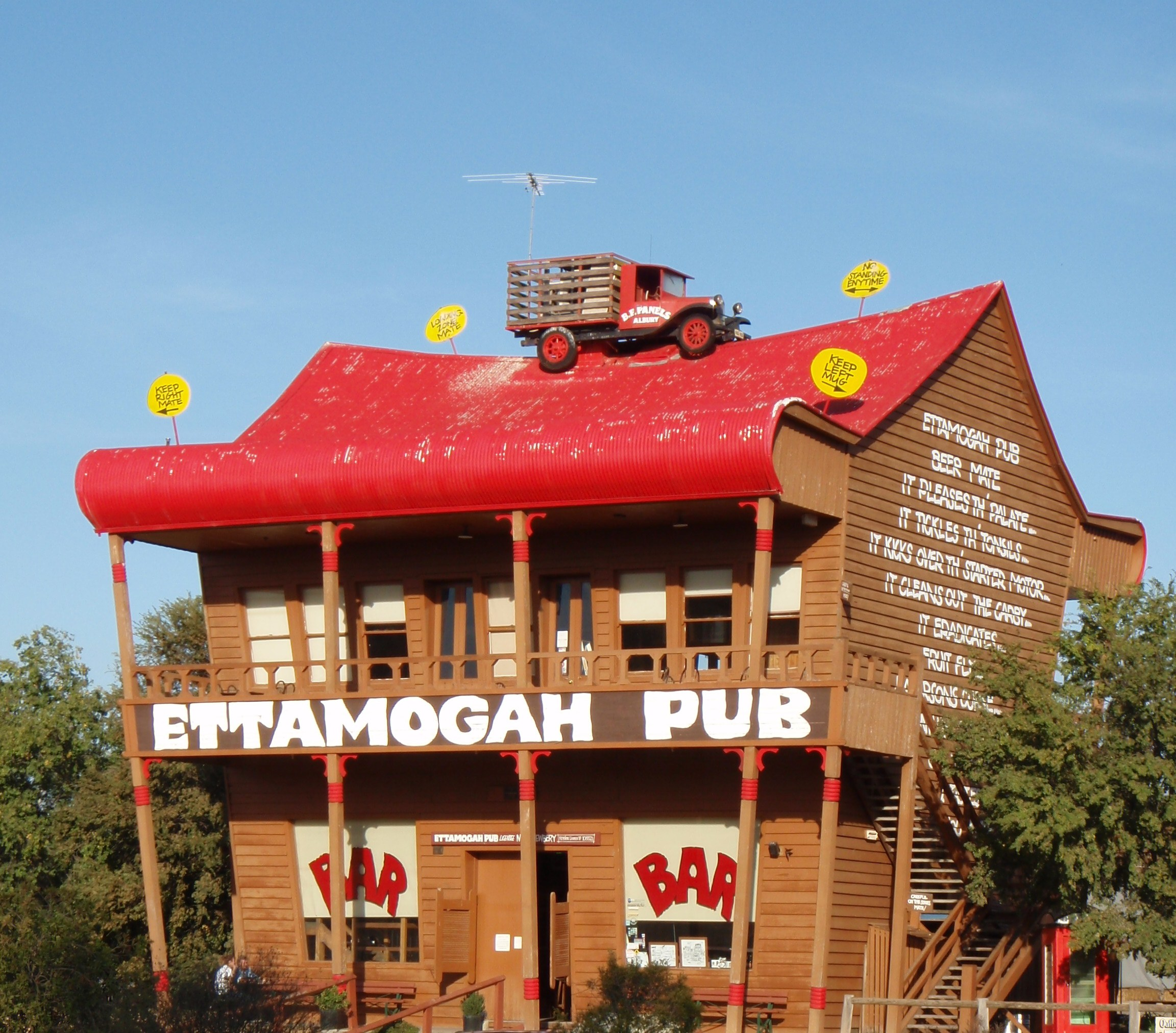
- The original Ettamogah Pub at Table Top, near Albury, New South Wales

- Location within New South Wales
- Etymology: Ettamogah

General information
- Status: Completed
- Type: Australian pub
- Location: Table Top, near Albury, New South Wales; Cunderdin, Western Australia, Australia
- Coordinates: 35°58′6″S 147°0′30″E
- Completed: 1987
- Client: Lindsay Cooper

The Ettamogah Pub is a cartoon Australian-style pub that was featured in the now defunct Australasian Post magazine. The cartoonist Ken Maynard, loving empty spaces and having nothing around him, enjoyed an area just outside Albury at Table Top, New South Wales, named Ettamogah, (Note: It has been claimed that "Ettamogah" is a Polynesian expression meaning "Have a drink") thus christening the eponymous name of his now famous pub. Between 1987 and 2003, a chain of four pubs were built in various parts of Australia including Sydney in New South Wales, and Cunderdin in Western Australia.

== Locations ==
=== Albury ===
The first pub was built by businessman Lindsay Cooper and first opened in 1987. The aim was to create a themed family restaurant which would become a tourist attraction. The timber building featured sloping walls and a distinctive architectural style true to the original cartoon design. In 2007, the hotel opened 17 new cabins for accommodation. The site also houses the Ken Maynard Museum and an artwork collection. In 2011, the owner Leigh O’Brien announced plans for a $3 million redevelopment which included the addition of a caravan park and a petrol station. In December 2025, the pub was put up for sale.

=== Sunshine Coast ===
The second pub opened at the Aussie World theme park at Palmview on the Sunshine Coast in 1989. It was opened by then Premier Mike Ahern. Construction took nine months and it cost $4.5 million. A 1927 Chevrolet sat atop the roof of this building. This followed a flood in the cartoon after which the owners couldn't be bothered to remove the vehicle. In 2010, to celebrate its 21st year of operations the pub began brewing and selling its own beer. In 2014, following a dispute over intellectual property rights, this pub has since removed any of the cartoon likenesses In 2018, the pub underwent a substantial redevelopment project which included more than 500 square metres of decking around the front and sides of the building. In 2019, it reopened and changed its name to Banana Bender Pub.

=== Cunderdin ===
A third Ettamogah Pub opened in the Western Australian wheat belt town of Cunderdin in 2001.

=== Sydney ===
The Ettamogah Pub in Sydney, is located on the corner of Merriville and Windsor roads, Kellyville Ridge. It is a copy of the original pub from Table Top and was opened in 2003. Although the appearance from the outside is a copy of the original the similarities end at the surface as the pub itself (the bar/drinking area) is inside the metal shed like structure adjoined to the rear of the wooden 'pub'. The wooden building is a 'walk through' entrance to the metal shed behind and does not share many similarities at all with the original beyond the outside appearance.

== Gallery ==
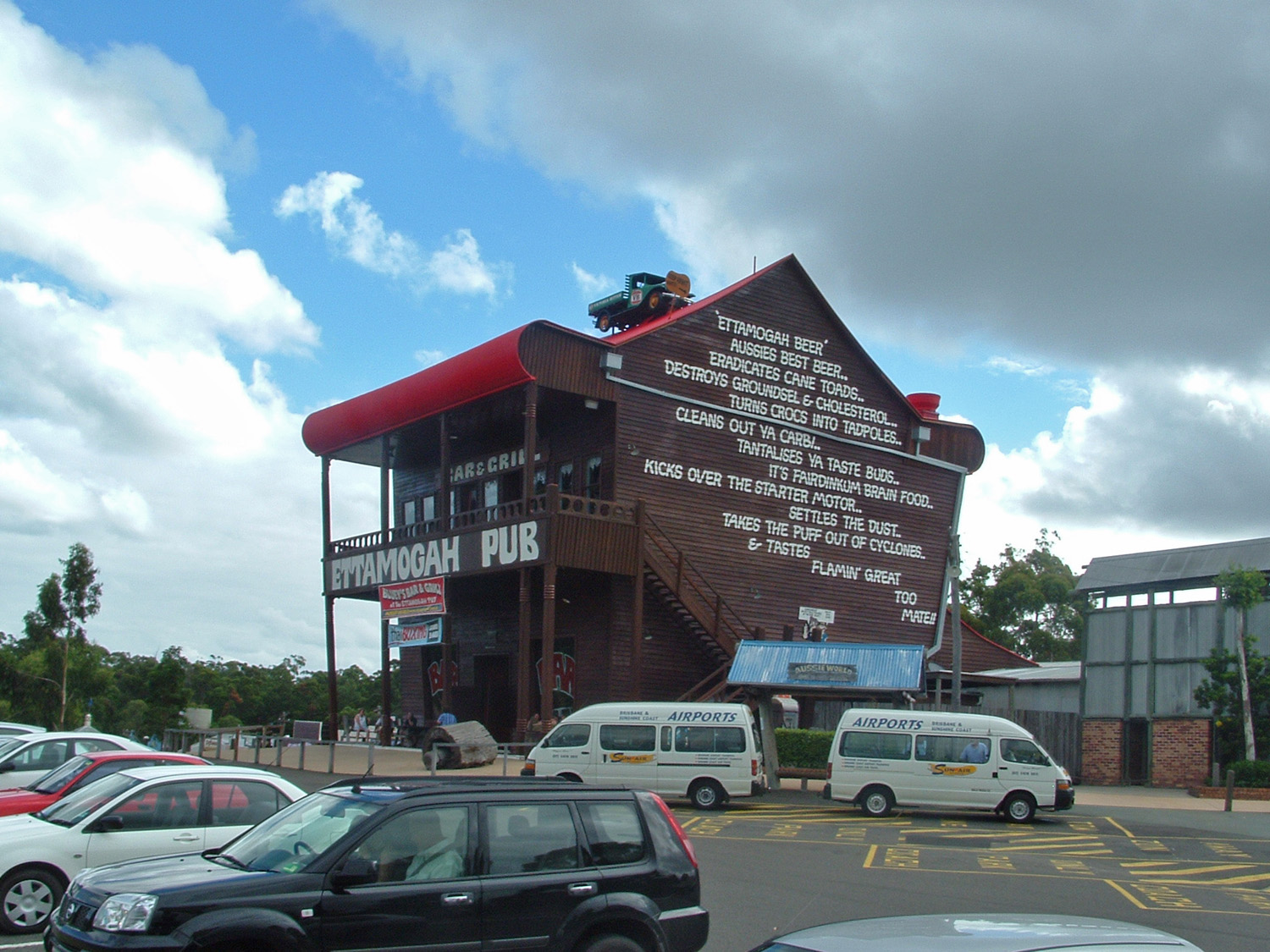
Ettamogah Pub on the Sunshine Coast

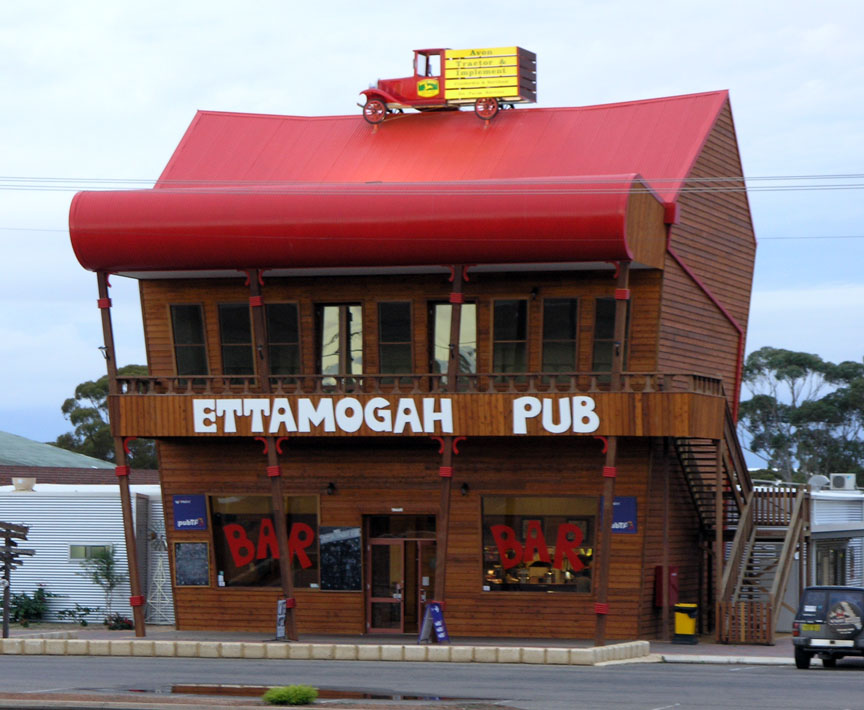
Ettamogah Pub, Cunderdin

== See also ==
- List of public houses in Australia
- Tourism in Australia
