= Hôtel Ravenstein =

Former aristocratic mansion in Brussels, Belgium

- Hôtel Ravenstein (French); Hotel Ravenstein (Dutch)
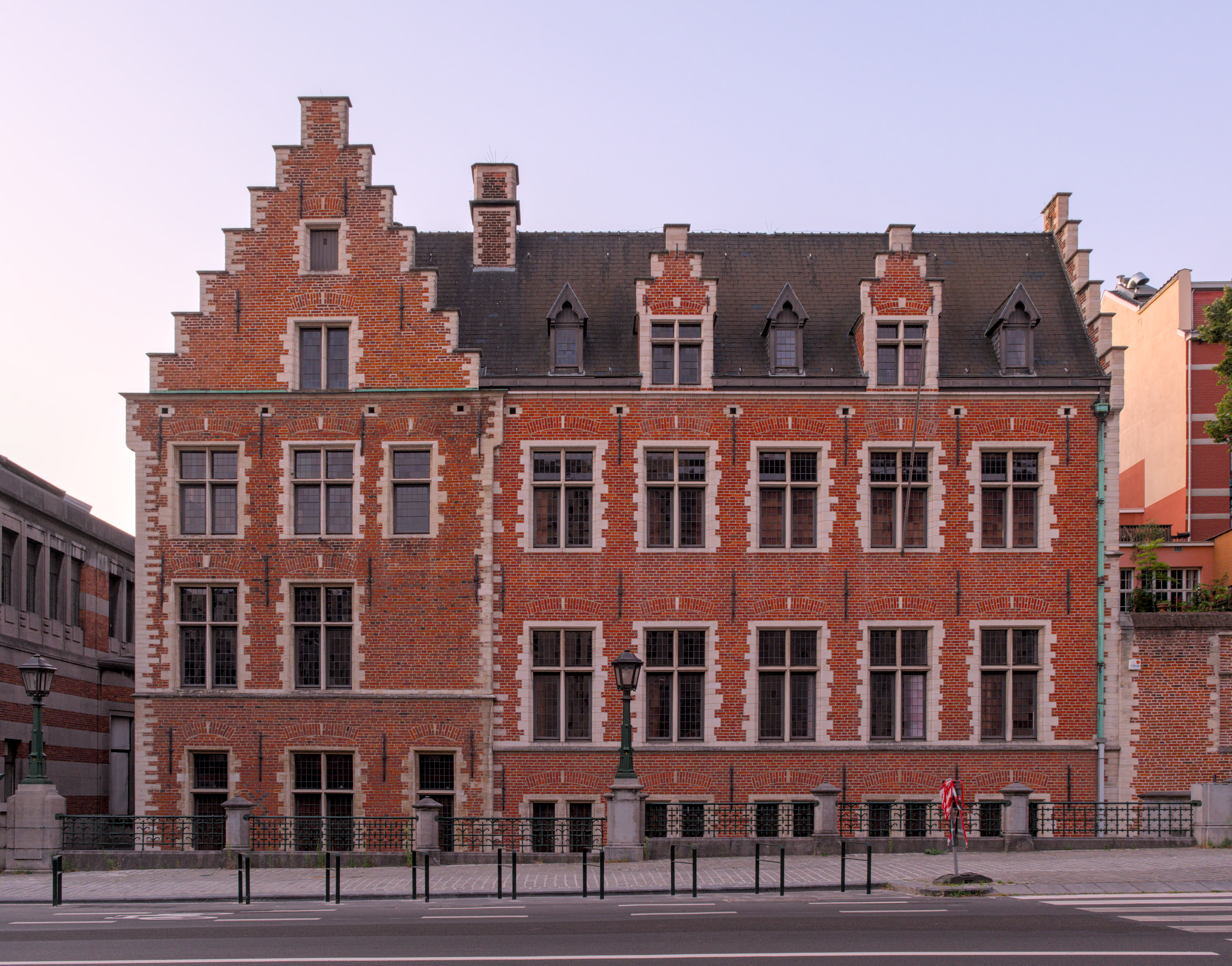
- The Hôtel Ravenstein seen from the Rue Ravenstein/Ravensteinstraat
- Interactive map of the Hôtel Ravenstein area
- Former names: Hôtel de Clèves-Ravenstein (French); Hotel van Cleve-Ravenstein (Dutch)

General information
- Type: Mansion
- Architectural style: Gothic; Brabantine Gothic; Flemish Renaissance
- Location: Rue Ravenstein / Ravensteinstraat 3, 1000 City of Brussels, Brussels-Capital Region, Belgium
- Coordinates: 50°50′37″N 4°21′32″E
- Construction started: 15th century
- Client: Adolph and Philip of Cleves, lords of Ravenstein

Design and construction
- Designations: Protected (27/09/1939)

Other information
- Public transit: Brussels-Central; 1 5 Gare Centrale/Centraal Station and Parc/Park

The Hôtel Ravenstein (French: Hôtel Ravenstein; Dutch: Hotel Ravenstein), formerly known as the Hôtel of Cleves-Ravenstein (French: Hôtel de Clèves-Ravenstein; Dutch: Hotel van Cleve-Ravenstein), is a late 15th-century former aristocratic mansion in Brussels, Belgium. It was originally built for Adolph and Philip of Cleves, lords of Ravenstein, and is the city's only remaining Burgundian-era mansion.

The building is located at 3, rue Ravenstein/Ravensteinstraat in the Royal Quarter (eastern part of Brussels' city centre), next to the Centre for Fine Arts, and across the street from Square – Brussels Convention Centre.

== History ==
=== The Hôtel of Cleves-Ravenstein ===
The Hôtel Ravenstein was originally part of a large complex of buildings erected on the site of the former Hôtel de Meldert by Adolph of Cleves and his son Philip, lords of Ravenstein, Netherlands, who settled at the second in 1460 and 1486. They transformed the Hôtel de Meldert and adjacent properties into an extensive ensemble, comprising the current Hôtel Ravenstein, a large residence across the Rue Ravenstein/Ravensteinstraat known as "the Synagogue", and a house with stables on the north side of the Rue Terarken/Terarkenstraat.

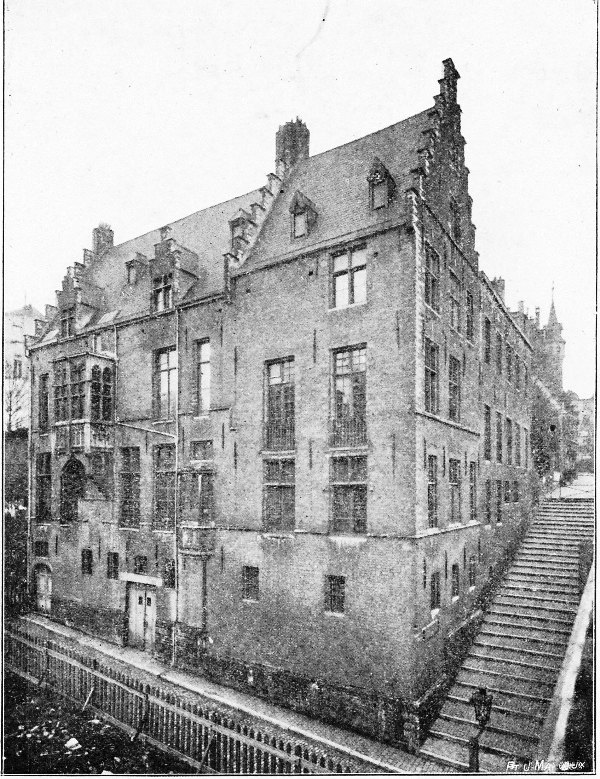
The Hôtel Ravenstein in 1913 with the Escalier des Juifs/Jodentrappen ("Jewish Stairs") on the right

Following Philip's death in 1528, the estate passed by testament to William, Duke of Jülich-Cleves-Berg. By 1609, it was owned by John George I, Elector of Saxony and occupied by his advisor P. Fuchs, who carried out restoration works in 1613. In 1656, the Count Palatine of Neuburg sold the complex in lots: the Synagogue went to the textile trader G. Ruffin, later used by a private school and the so-called Hôtel Dupuich, and demolished in 1909–1911; the house with stables and garden was purchased by the painter David Teniers the Younger, later converted into a residence and occupied in 1875 by the École Catholique Saint-Jacques, also demolished in 1911. The Hôtel Ravenstein remained with the Electors until 1680, then successively with Dona F. de Salinas (1686), the Thisquen family (1714), and Baron J.I. Vander Linden-d'Hoogvorst (1752). From 1780, it belonged to the de Neufforge family, who carried out significant modifications and embellishments.

=== Later history ===
In 1893–94, minor restoration works were conducted by the architect Paul Saintenoy for rental to learned societies. The city expropriated the property in 1894 for the redevelopment of the Rue Ravenstein. From 1894, the Société Royale Belge des Ingénieurs et des Industriels (S.R.B.I.I.) was established on the site. In 1896, plans by the City of Brussels' then-mayor, Charles Buls, to create a Hôtel des Sociétés Savantes—designed by Saintenoy and presented at the 1897 World's Fair as the Palais de la Ville de Bruxelles—were abandoned. From circa 1900, the Hôtel Ravenstein served as the headquarters of the Société Belge d'Études Coloniales, alongside similar groups such as the Cercle Africain and the Ligue Nationale pour l'Œuvre Africaine.

In 1921, Geert Van Bruaene, an anti-conformist poet, gallerist, and friend of the surrealist group, opened his first gallery, Le Cabinet Maldoror, in the Hôtel Ravenstein. He was among the first to exhibit artists such as Paul Klee, Max Ernst, and René Magritte. Le Cabinet Maldoror quickly became a central venue for art in Brussels, but Van Bruaene was not a businessman, and the gallery eventually closed. In 1924, it reopened as À la Vierge Poupine on the Rue de Namur/Naamsestraat, where he continued to exhibit surrealist works.

The building underwent thorough restoration in 1934–1937 under the city architect François Malfait, using replacement brick and natural stone, including Gobertange and Reffroy stone for the façades. It was classified as a historic monument on 27 September 1939.

== Architecture ==
The complex is arranged in a U-shaped plan around a central courtyard, with a lower basse-cour to the north. Constructed in Brabantine late Gothic brick and sandstone, the building demonstrates typical features of affluent private architecture of its period, despite later modifications and extensive restorations, including partial reconstruction. The wings are one to two storeys with basements, aligned with street level, and covered by gabled and mansard slate roofs. Characteristic elements include stepped gables, cross-windows, string courses, corner blocks, roof dormers with shoulder details, and scaffolding holes.

=== Exterior ===
The northern wing, parallel to the Rue Terarken, has eight bays with cross-window and rounded-arch doors. A reconstructed rectangular oriel (1934–1937) features trefoil tracery, shield motifs, colonnettes, and a projecting corbelled basket arch. The stepped gable on the Rue Ravenstein includes three bays with twin-light windows. The western wing, parallel to the Rue Ravenstein, incorporates 18th-century modifications and five bays of cross and twin-light windows. The inner courtyard façades include a two-bay stepped gable with portico, preserved 18th-century Louis XVI doorway, and reconstructed windows. The shorter eastern wing has two bays and cross-windows with a rounded-arch door. A single-bay stair tower, a concierge house (added 1934–1937), and a cobbled courtyard with 18th-century rosette pattern and a sandstone arcade with de Neufforge coat of arms complete the exterior.

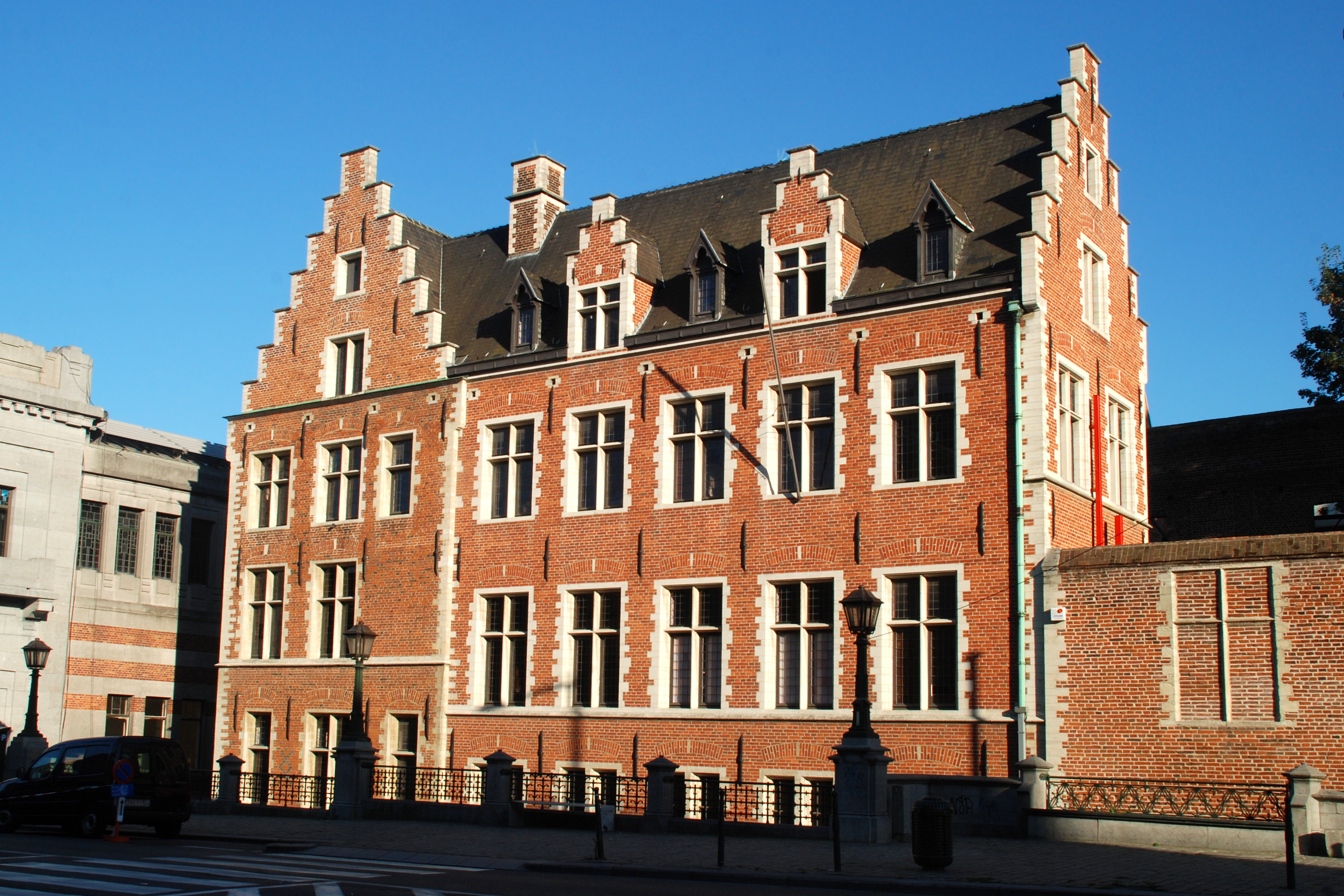
Main façade

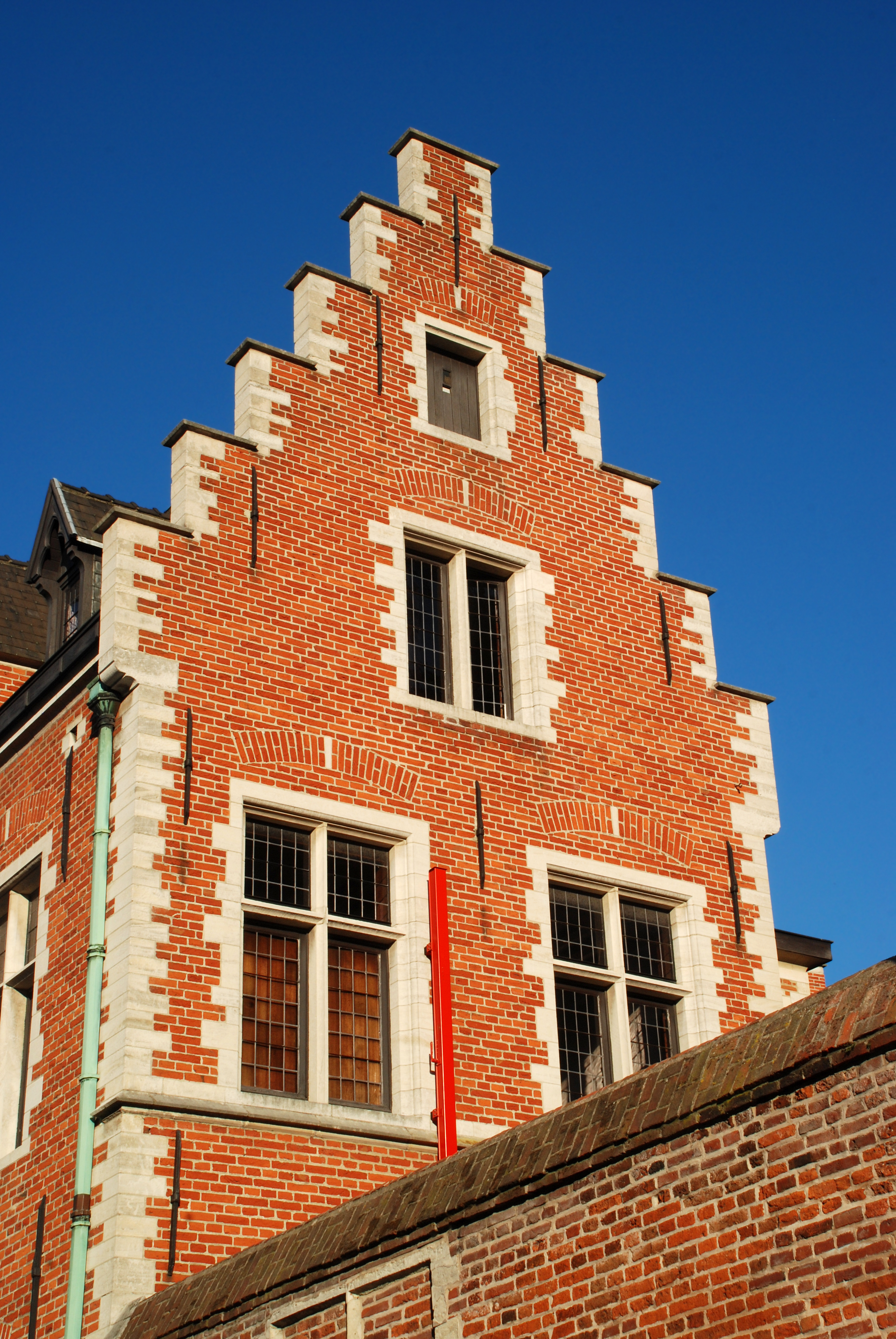
South gable

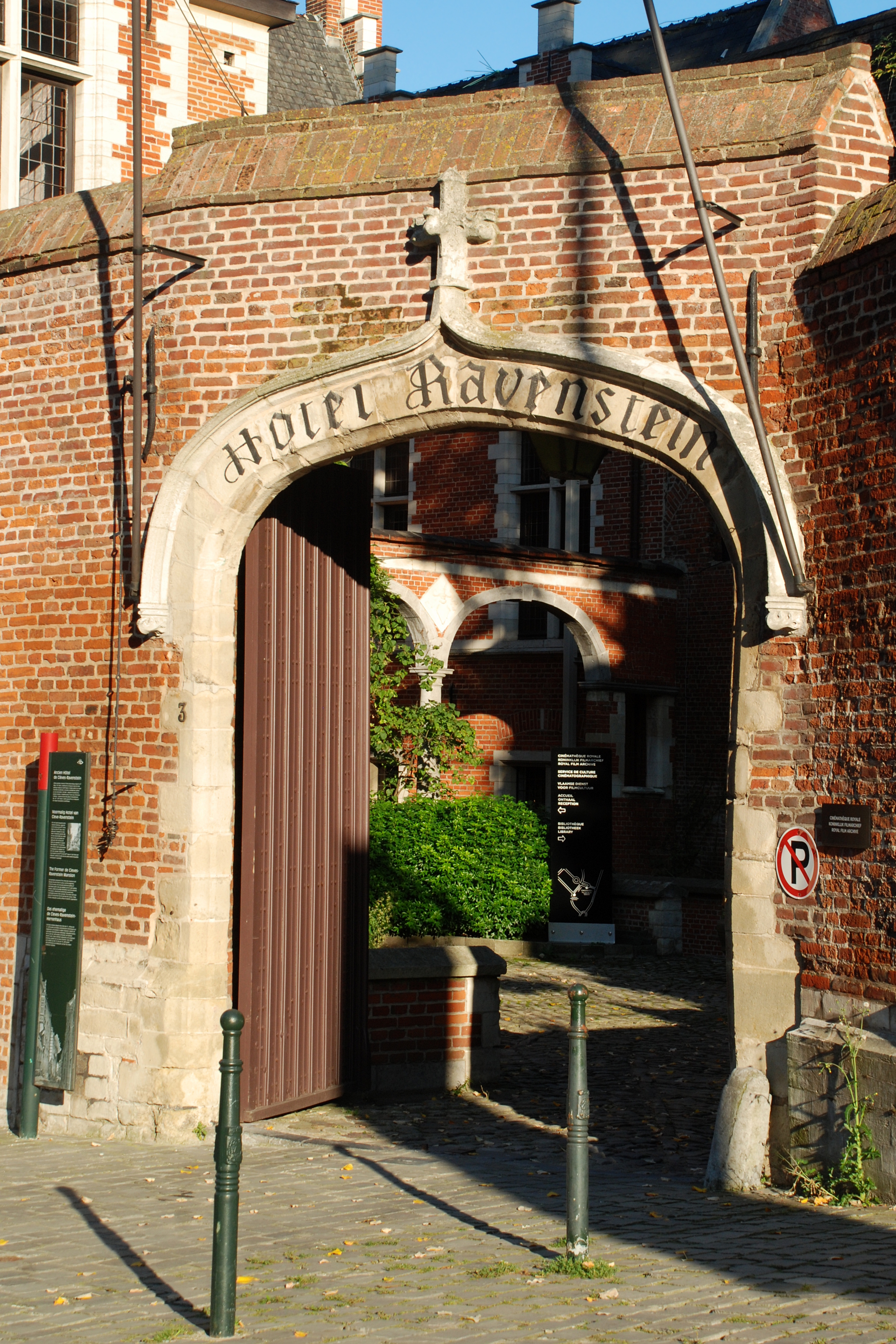
Portal

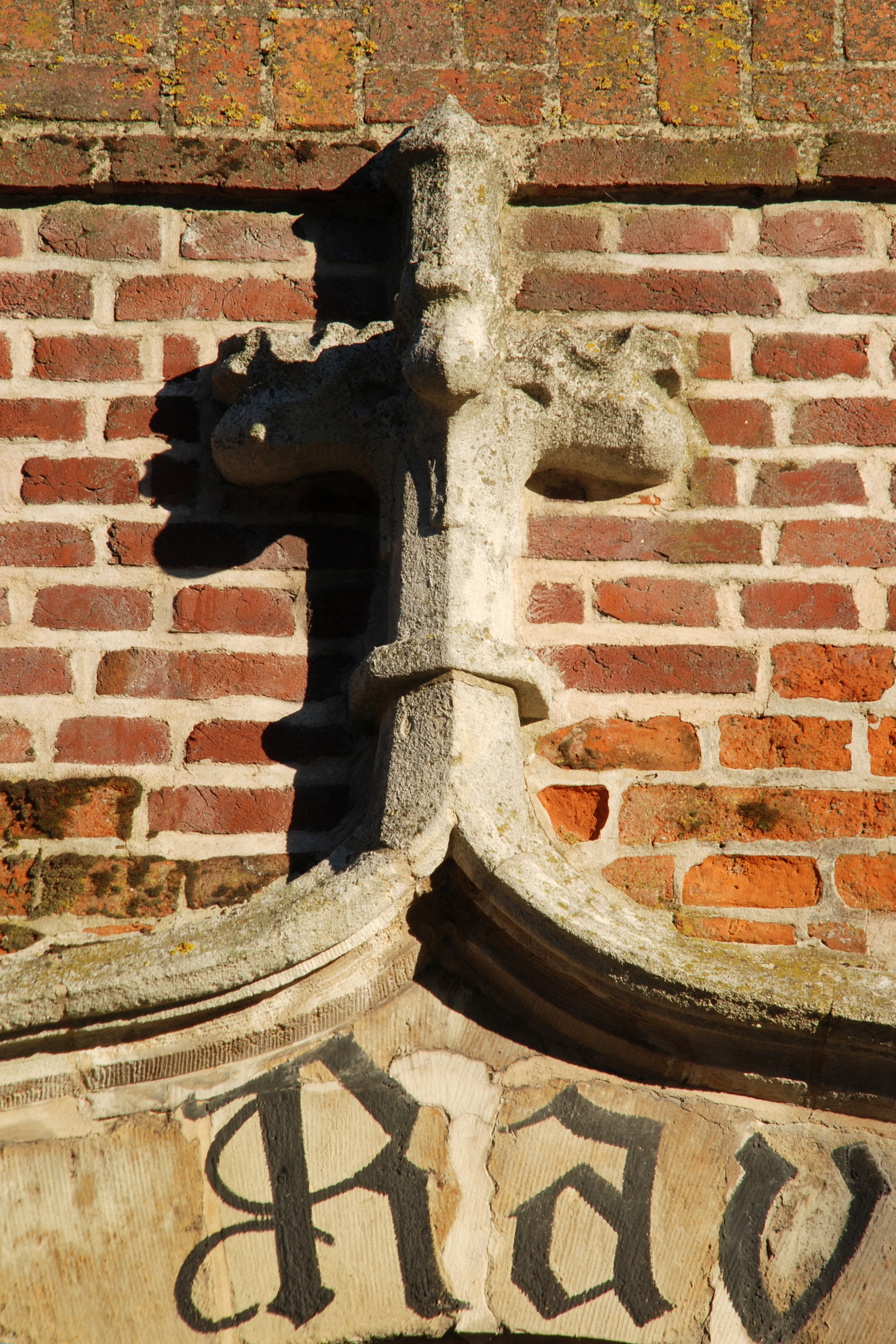
Finial of the portal

=== Interior ===
The interior was almost entirely restored in 1935–1937, retaining some late 15th to early 16th-century features and 18th-century refurbishments. Key spaces include the entrance hall with oak staircase and Louis XVI baluster, classicist-stucco rooms with trophy decorations and marble fireplaces, the Conference Room with oak beam ceiling and Philip of Cleve heraldry, the Cordoba Room with similar ceiling and de Neufforge arms, and the Portrait Room with 18th-century stucco. The reconstructed private chapel features a star vault, and the attic houses a large meeting room beneath an open timber roof structure.

== See also ==
- History of Brussels
- Culture of Belgium
- Belgium in the long nineteenth century
