= Société Belge d'Études Coloniales =

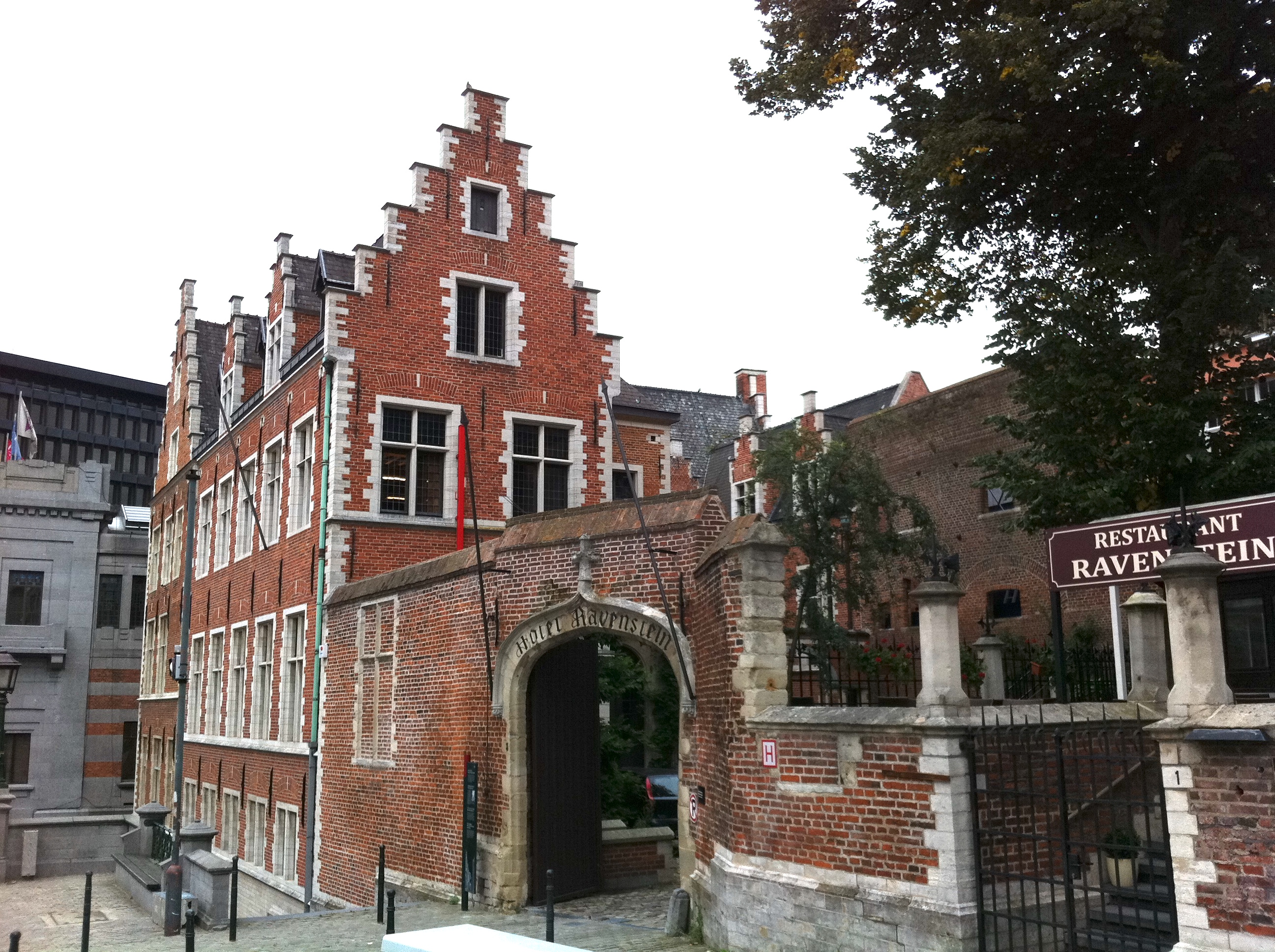
Hôtel Ravenstein, on Rue Ravenstein in Brussels, was SEC headquarters circa 1900s (2011 photo)

The Société d'Études Coloniales (lit. 'Society for Colonial Studies') was a society that promoted the creation and maintenance of Belgian overseas colonies which was established in 1894. For some years it was headquartered in the Hôtel Ravenstein in Brussels (along with similar groups such as the Cercle Africain and the Ligue Nationale pour l'Œuvre Africaine). By 1902 it had a library.

Auguste Couvreur served briefly as its first chairman. Other members included Alexandre Halot. "Of the twenty-nine founding members of the Société, fourteen had civil functions (eleven were lawyers), nine were intellectuals,...five were soldiers,...one was a businessman.

As of 2008, the Society's archives were reported to have been lost.

== See also ==
- Institut Royal Colonial Belge (est. 1928)

== Bibliography ==
issued by the society

- Bulletin de la Société d'études coloniales (in French), OCLC 18922350 – via HathiTrust 1894-
- Albert Donny (1896–1897). Manuel du voyageur et du résident au Congo (in French). 1900 ed.
- Bibliotheque, Société d'Études Coloniales: Catalogue (in French), Brussels: A. Lesigne, 1902 via Google Books

about the society

- Maarten Couttenier (2005). Congo tentoongesteld: Een geschiedenis van de Belgische antropologie en het museum van Tervuren (1882–1925 (in Dutch). Leuven. pp. 121–124. ISBN 9033457709. "Société d'Études Coloniales"
