= Kellyville Ridge =

- Suburb
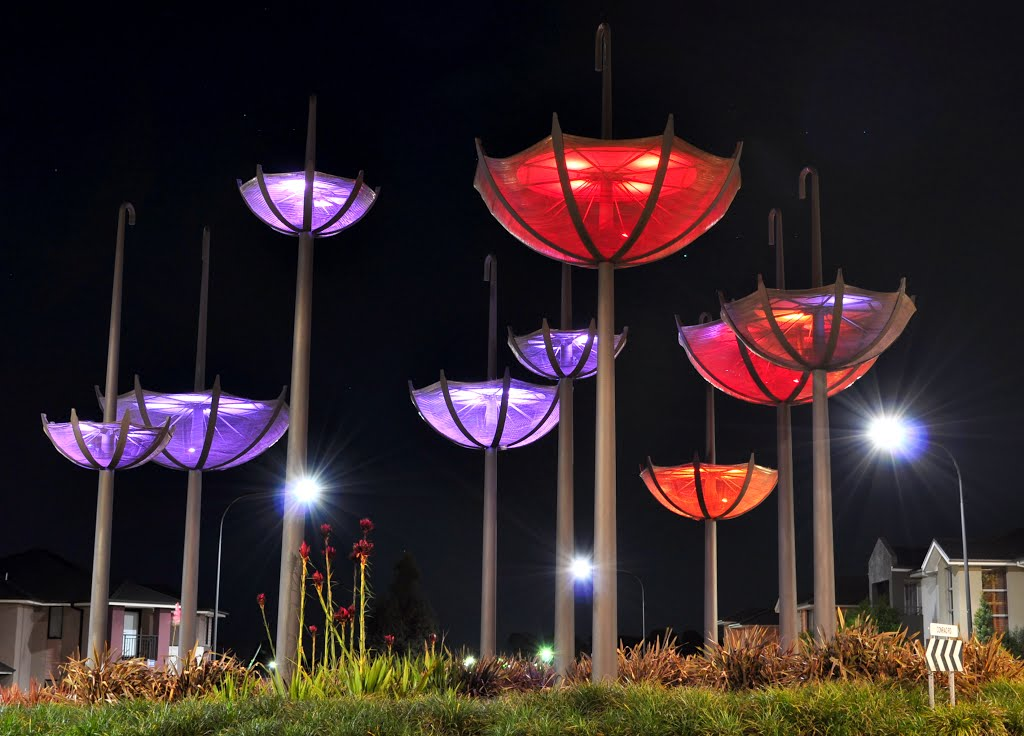

- Interactive map of Kellyville Ridge
- Country: Australia
- State: New South Wales
- City: Sydney
- LGA: City of Blacktown
- Location: 41 km (25 mi) north-west of Sydney CBD
- Established: 2002

Government
  - State electorate: Riverstone
  - Federal division: Greenway
- Elevation: 74 m (243 ft)

Population
  - Total: 10,890 (2021 census)
- Postcode: 2155
Suburbs around Kellyville Ridge
The Ponds	Rouse Hill	Rouse Hill
The Ponds	Kellyville Ridge	Beaumont Hills
Stanhope Gardens	Stanhope Gardens	Kellyville

Kellyville Ridge is a suburb of Sydney, in the state of New South Wales, Australia. Kellyville Ridge is located 41 kilometres north-west of the Sydney central business district in the local government area of City of Blacktown. It is part of Greater Western Sydney.

== History ==
The suburb takes its name from the ridge, the main geographical feature of vertical significance in the northern part of the area. Kellyville Ridge is thought to be the area where the Castle Hill Rebellion (also known as the Second Battle of Vinegar Hill) took place, many roads and reserves are named after it in Kellyville and a memorial was placed in Castlebrook Lawn Cemetery in 1988. Kellyville Ridge was originally part of Kellyville and became a separate suburb when the area west of Windsor Road was renamed in 2002.

== Heritage listings ==
Kellyville Ridge has a number of heritage-listed sites, including:

- Merriville House and Gardens

== Population ==
In the 2021 Census, there were 10,890 people in Kellyville Ridge. 54.0% of people were born in Australia. The next most common countries of birth were India 13.0%, Philippines 3.6%, China 2.2%, Fiji 1.8% and England 1.7%. 52.8% of people spoke only English at home. Other languages spoken at home included Hindi 5.1%, Punjabi 4.9%, Mandarin 2.7%, Gujarati 2.3% and Arabic 2.1%. The most common responses for religion were Catholic 25.7%, No Religion 18.9%, Hinduism 14.3% and Islam 8.4%.

== Growth ==
Kellyville Ridge is one of the fastest growing suburbs in Sydney. Population estimates by the Australian Bureau of Statistics indicated that Kellyville Ridge and surrounding neighbourhoods had the largest growth in 2013–14 in Sydney. The area experienced one of metropolitan Sydney's fastest growth rates, with a 9 per cent increase in population in 12 months.

== Commercial area ==
The Ponds Shopping Centre, opened on 30 May 2015, is the main shopping facility that services Kellyville Ridge. It is located on the western perimeter of the suburb at the intersection of The Ponds Boulevard and Riverbank Drive. It houses Woolworths plus other 25 specialty stores, cafes and restaurants. It also features a Medical and Dental Centre and a Priceline Pharmacy.

Stanhope Village is a shopping centre adjacent to the suburb, with Aldi, Coles, Kmart and other specialised retail, service, fashion and food outlets.

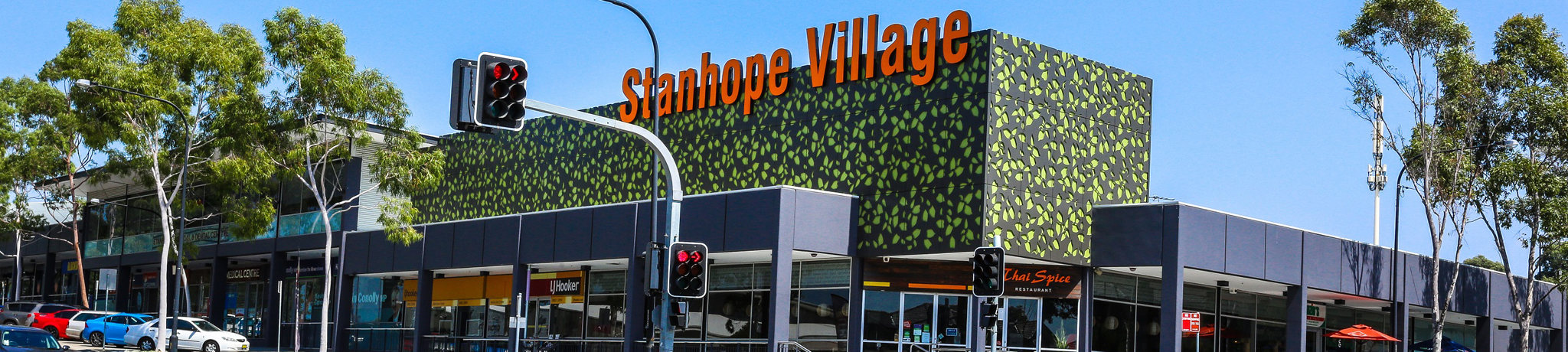
Stanhope Village Shopping Centre

Alternative shopping is provided by the Rouse Hill Town Centre, located 1 kilometre away at Rouse Hill, where approximately 250 retail stores are available featuring Coles, Woolworths, Target, Big W and Reading Cinemas. Castle Towers, located 9 kilometres away, and Westpoint Blacktown, located 10 kilometres away, provide for other places of shopping.

== Education ==
School located in Kellyville Ridge includes:

- Kellyville Ridge Public School (Public Primary School, Corner of Greenwich St & Singleton Ave, Kellyville Ridge NSW 2155)

Kellyville Ridge has the following public school catchment:

- John Palmer Public School (Public Primary School, The Ponds).
- The Ponds High School (Public High School, The Ponds).
- Rouse Hill High School (Public High School, Rouse Hill).

== Transport ==
=== Road to Sydney CBD ===
Transport to the city is provided by the M2 and M7 motorway. Driving time to Sydney CBD is approximately 34 minutes by car.

=== Train to Sydney CBD via Parramatta ===
Kellyville Ridge is located within 8 minutes drive (5.2 km) to Schofields railway station and 10 minutes (6 km) to Quakers Hill railway station. Trip by train from these stations to Sydney CBD takes around 47 minutes. Both stations have free all-day commuters parking. The train services also stop at the busy business area of Parramatta, Westmead and Strathfield.

=== Buses to Sydney CBD ===
CDC NSW services take around 1 hour to Sydney CBD from Kellyville Ridge. The suburb is serviced by the 616X which travels through Kellyville Ridge.

=== Sydney Metro to Chatswood ===
The North West Rail Link which opened 26 May 2019 – now known as Sydney Metro Northwest – provides high frequency services to Kellyville Ridge, linking it to Sydney CBD in around 50 minutes, which will drop to 40 minutes on completion of the second stage of the project. The metro service passes through Norwest Business Park, Castle Hill, Epping, Macquarie Park and University, North Ryde, Chatswood, and North Sydney.

Kellyville Ridge is positioned in a strategic location surrounded by three railway stations sitting on its perimeters; Tallawong, Rouse Hill and Kellyville. Both Tallawong and Kellyville provide all-day commuter parking. CDC NSW route 663 and Busways route 731 connect Kellyville Ridge with the Rouse Hill metro station, whilst CDC NSW routes 603, 632 (from Merriville Road and Perfection Ave) and 651 (from Merriville T-way) connect to Kellyville station.

=== Buses to other business areas ===
CDC NSW provides services to Parramatta (603, 663, 665), Rouse Hill (603, 632, 651, 663, 665), Epping (651) and Pennant Hills (632).

Busways provides services to Blacktown (731, 735) and Rouse Hill (731, 735).

== Entertainment ==
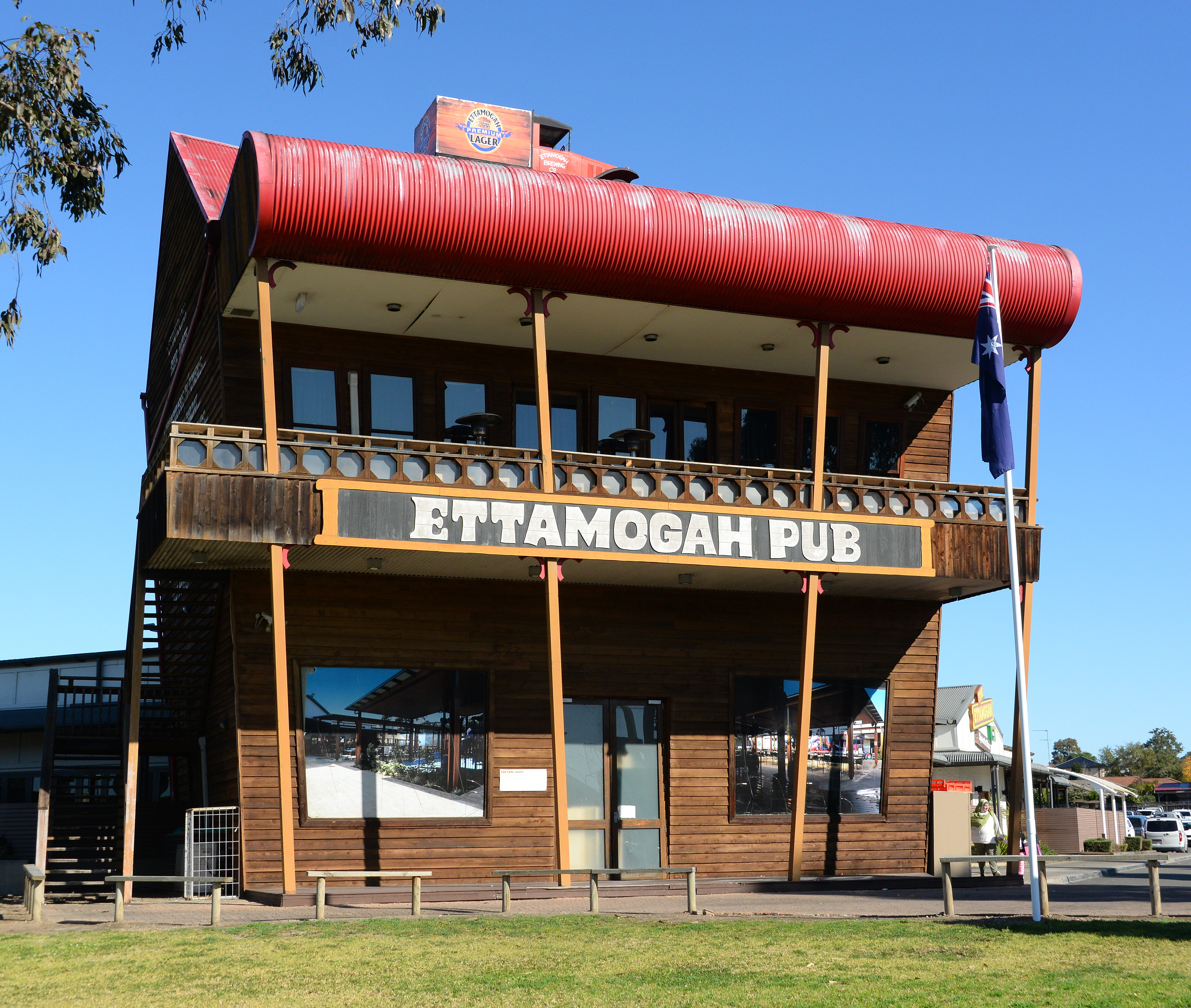
Ettamogah Pub, Kellyville Ridge

The Ettamogah Pub renovated in 2014 is located on the corner of Merriville & Windsor Roads. The hotel received from the Australian Hotel Association the award for Best Family Friendly Hotel in New South Wales.

== Housing ==
Kellyville Ridge has gone under many new developments since 2002, with new estates developing quickly. There are also several medium-rise apartments on the southern side of the suburb, backing Windsor Road.
