= Auguste Couvreur =

Belgian politician and publicist

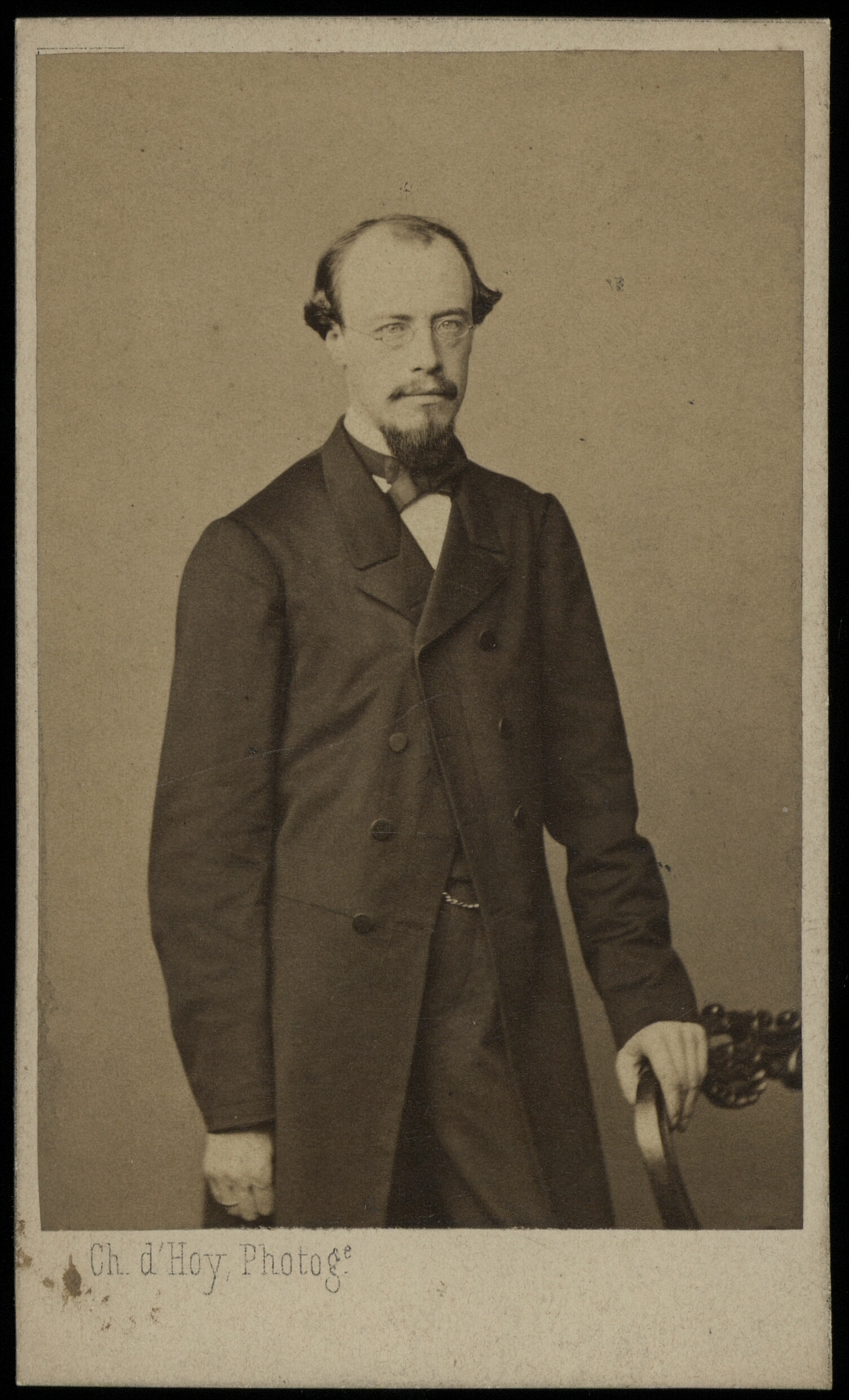
Auguste Couvreur

Auguste Pierre Louis Couvreur (24 October 1827 in Ghent – 23 April 1894 in Ixelles) was a Belgian politician and publicist.

Couvreur, was the senior foreign member of the Cobden Club, and has been connected with the Independence Belge both as contributor and editor, was for twenty years one of the Liberal representatives of Brussels, and for four years Vice-President of the Chamber. In 1894 he briefly belonged to the newly formed Société Belge d'Études Coloniales.

He founded the first municipal girls' school for secondary education in Brussels, called 'Ecole professionnelle pour jeunes filles' . This school is now known as 'Institut De Mot-Couvreur'( it merged with the Institut De Mot' and was set up in 1975). One of his interests apart from free trade was education and social progress

== Personal life ==
In 1885, Couvreur married "Madame Jessie Tasma", an English-born Australian novelist and lecturer.
