= Ken Maynard (cartoonist) =

Australian cartoonist

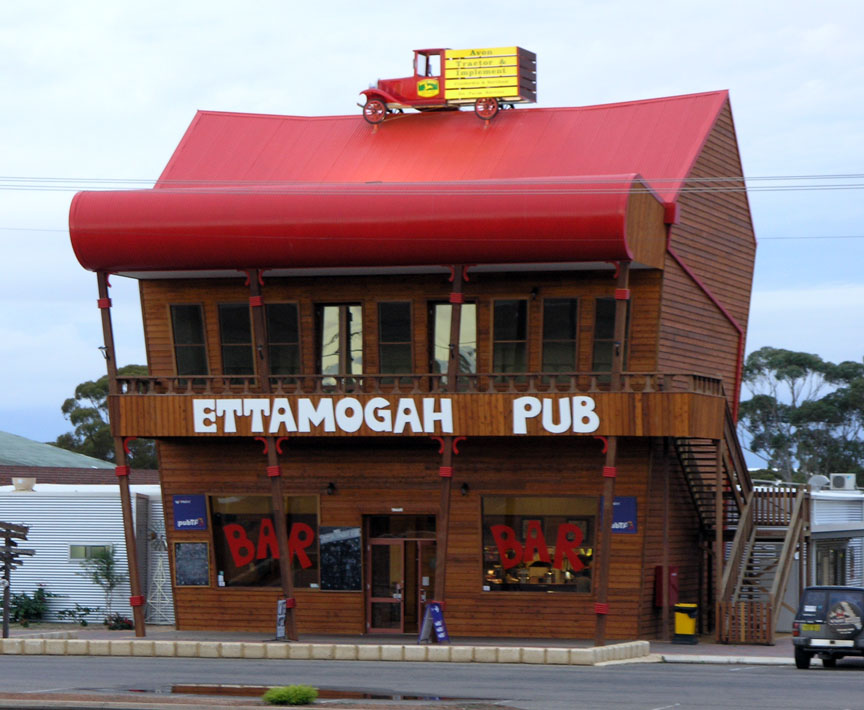
Ettamogah Pub, Cunderdin.

Ken Maynard (born Albury, New South Wales in 1928 – died 29 September 1998 Gold Coast, Queensland) was an Australian cartoonist.

Maynard had an older sister, Florence, and a younger brother, Thomas.

Originally a police officer, Maynard got his break as a cartoonist in 1958 contributing his Ettamogah Pub cartoons to the Australasian Post. They became a main feature of the magazine and his cartoons were run until its last edition.

These cartoons were the inspiration for a chain of Ettamogah Pubs throughout Australia. There are Ettamogah Pubs in Sydney, Albury-Wodonga, and Cunderdin.

Maynard died on 29 September 1998 due to liver cancer.
