= Australasian Post =

Defunct Australian weekly magazine

- Cover of the Australasian Post for 29 January 1953
- Frequency: Weekly
- Founded: 1864 (as The Australasian newspaper)
- Final issue: 2002
- Country: Australia
- Based in: Melbourne
- Language: English
- ISSN: 0004-8437

The Australasian Post, commonly called the Aussie Post and was originally named Bell's Life in Victoria and Sporting Chronicle, was Australia's longest-running weekly picture magazine.

== History and profile ==
Its origins are traceable to Saturday, 3 January 1857, when the first issue of Bell's Life in Victoria and Sporting Chronicle (probably best known for Tom Wills's famous 1858 Australian rules football letter) was released. The weekly, which was produced by Charles Frederic Somerton in Melbourne, was one of several Bell's Life publications based on the format of Bell's Life in London, a Sydney version having been published since 1845.

On 1 October 1864, the weekly newspaper The Australasian was launched in Melbourne, Victoria by the proprietors of The Argus. It supplanted three unprofitable Argus publications: The Weekly Argus, The Examiner, and The Yeoman, and contained features of all three. A competitor, The Age, gloated that as it was printed on coarse heavy paper, its weight exceeded the maximum for concessional postage, adding to its cost to country subscribers.

Its format was similar to the Bell's Life papers, but with much less sport content. As a result, the local papers Bell's Life in Victoria and Bell's Life in Sydney were gradually phased out of publication. On Saturday, 4 January 1868, the last Melbourne issue appeared (no. 504), while the last Sydney issue (No. 731) came out on Saturday, 31 December 1870 (no. 731). The Australasian adopted locally based editions during the transition. Well-known writers who contributed to its pages include Marcus Clarke (including series The Peripatetic Philosopher under the pseudonym "Q"), T. A. Browne as "Rolf Boldrewood", Ada Cambridge, Louisa Anne Meredith, J. E. Neild, C. H. Spence, and Jessie Couvreur.

The Australasian Sketcher with Pen and Pencil, which was founded by The Argus in April 1873, merged with The Australasian after its last issue of 26 December 1889.

=== Editors ===
- Frederick William Haddon 1865 to 1866
- James Smith 1871 to 1872
- Henry Gullett 1872 to 1885
- David Watterston 1885 to 1903
- Edward Thomas Fricker 1903 to 1917
- Alexander Hugh Chisholm 1937 to 1938

=== Transition to Post ===
The final edition of The Australasian appeared on 6 April 1946, published by The Argus and Australasian Limited, 365 Elizabeth Street, Melbourne, with an announcement that "Next week, this magazine becomes The Australasian Post in an entirely new format, with modern enlarged content."

The Australasian Post was read by millions at the height of its popularity in the 1960s and 1970s, and featured a mix of scandal, sensationalism, human interest stories, fashion, politics, culture and entertainment, being the staple of barber shops across the country.

One of its features was its focus on Australiana, with pages of jokes and cartoons, including the Ettamogah Pub series by cartoonist Ken Maynard. Its "Letters" column was titled "Pillar to Post", a punning reference to the pillar box method of posting a letter.

In the late 1960s and 1970s, the magazine's covers and content included illustrations and stories focused on sex and nudity.

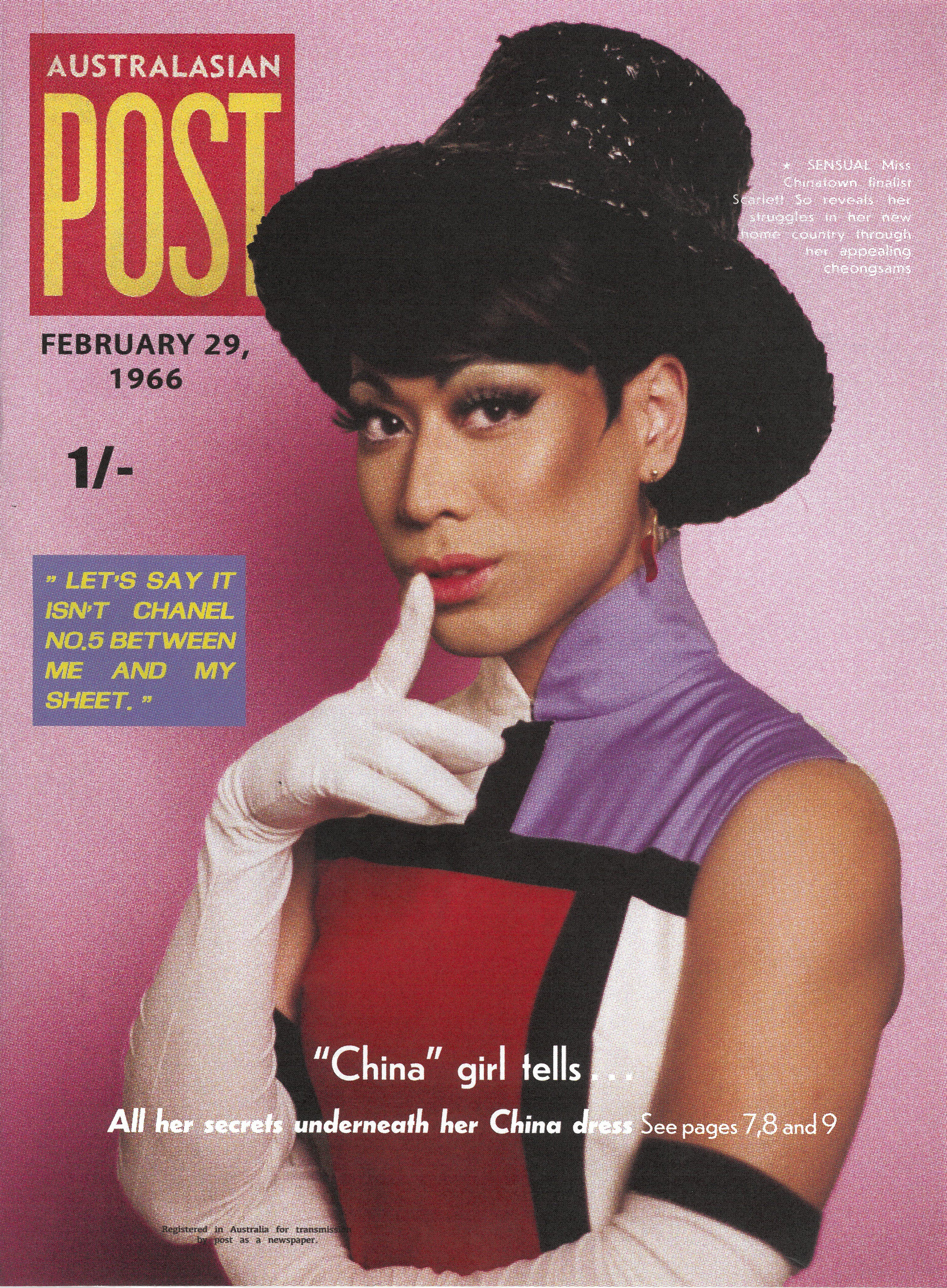
Cover of Australasian Post With Miss Chinatown wearing a Christian Dior hat and a Cheongsam replica of Yves Saint Laurent Mondrian Dress in the 1966

In 1982, The Sun News-Pictorial features editor Feyne Weaver was appointed Australasian Post editor: he immediately doubled the number of articles in the magazine. The circulation rose to an all-time high, overtaking the then market leader People before Weaver resigned in mid-1984 to move to the United States.

Post's trademark bikini-clad cover girl began to look old-fashioned in the late 1980s, and it suffered a rapid decline in popularity. The magazine was renamed Aussie Post in 1997, but it was not enough and it closed on 2 February 2002, after 138 years. At the time of its last edition, it was the longest-running continuously published magazine in Australia.
