= Patricia Clarke (historian) =

Australian historian and writer (1926–2026)

Mary Patricia Clarke OAM FAHA (30 July 1926 – 9 March 2026) was an Australian writer, historian and journalist who wrote about 19th century women in Australia.

== Early life and education ==
Clarke was born in Alphington, Melbourne on 30 July 1926, to John L. Ryan, a teacher, and Annie T. Ryan (nee McSweeney). She was educated in Melbourne until the family moved to Sale where she went to secondary school and then at the University of Melbourne.

== Career ==
Clarke worked as a journalist at the Australian News and Information Bureau in Melbourne and Canberra, for the Australian Broadcasting Corporation in the Press Gallery, Parliament House, Canberra, as journalist and editor for Maxwell Newton Publications and as Editor of Publications for the National Capital Development Commission. She has published numerous books about women in Australian history, with a particular interest in female journalists.

She was an honorary fellow of the Australian Academy of the Humanities, fellow of the Federation of the Australian Historical Societies and awardee of a Medal of the Order of Australia for contributions to literature on Australian history.

== Death ==
Clarke died in Canberra on 9 March 2026, at the age of 99.

== Awards ==
- 1993 Harold White Fellow, National Library of Australia
- 1995 Joint winner, Society of Women Writers non-fiction award
- 2001 Medal of the Order of Australia (OAM)
- 2002 Fellow Federation of Australian Historical Societies
- 2005 Honorary Fellow Australian Academy of Humanities
- 2016 Friends Medal National Library of Australia
- 2016 Petherick Medal National Library of Australia
- 2025 Australian Dictionary of Biography Medal

== Bibliography ==
- Bold Types: How Australian women journalists blazed a trail (National Library of Australia Publisher, 2022)
- Great Expectations: Emigrant Governesses in Colonial Australia (National Library of Australia Publisher, 2020)
- Eilean Giblin: A feminist between the wars (Monash University Publishing 2013). Short-listed for 2014 Magarey Medal for Biography.
- With Love and Fury: Selected Letters of Judith Wright, ed., with Meredith McKinney (National Library of Australia 2007)
- The Equal Heart and Mind: Letters between Judith Wright and Jack McKinney, ed. with Meredith McKinney (University of Queensland Press, 2004)
- Steps to Federation: Lectures marking the Centenary of Federation, ed.. (Australian Scholarly Publishing, 2001)
- Rosa! Rosa! A Life of Rosa Praed, Novelist and Spiritualist. (Melbourne University Press, 1999)
- Tasma's Diaries (Mulini Press, 1995)
- Tasma: The Life of Jessie Couvreur, Allen & Unwin, Sydney, 1994. Joint winner Society of Women Writers' Non-fiction Award.
- Life Lines: Australian Women's Letters and Diaries 1788–1840 (with Dale Spender). (Allen & Unwin, 1992)
- Pioneer Writer: The Life of Louisa Atkinson, Novelist, Journalist, Naturalist. (Allen & Unwin,1990.)
- Pen Portraits: Women Writers and Journalists in Nineteenth Century Australia. (Allen & Unwin, 1988; Pandora, London 1988)
- A Colonial Woman: The Life and Times of Mary Braidwood Mowle 1827–1857. (Allen & Unwin 1986, Eden Killer Whale Museum and Historical Society, 2001, 2003, 2006)
- The Governesses: Letters from the Colonies 1862–1882. (Allen & Unwin 1989)
