= Albury =

City in New South Wales, Australia

- City
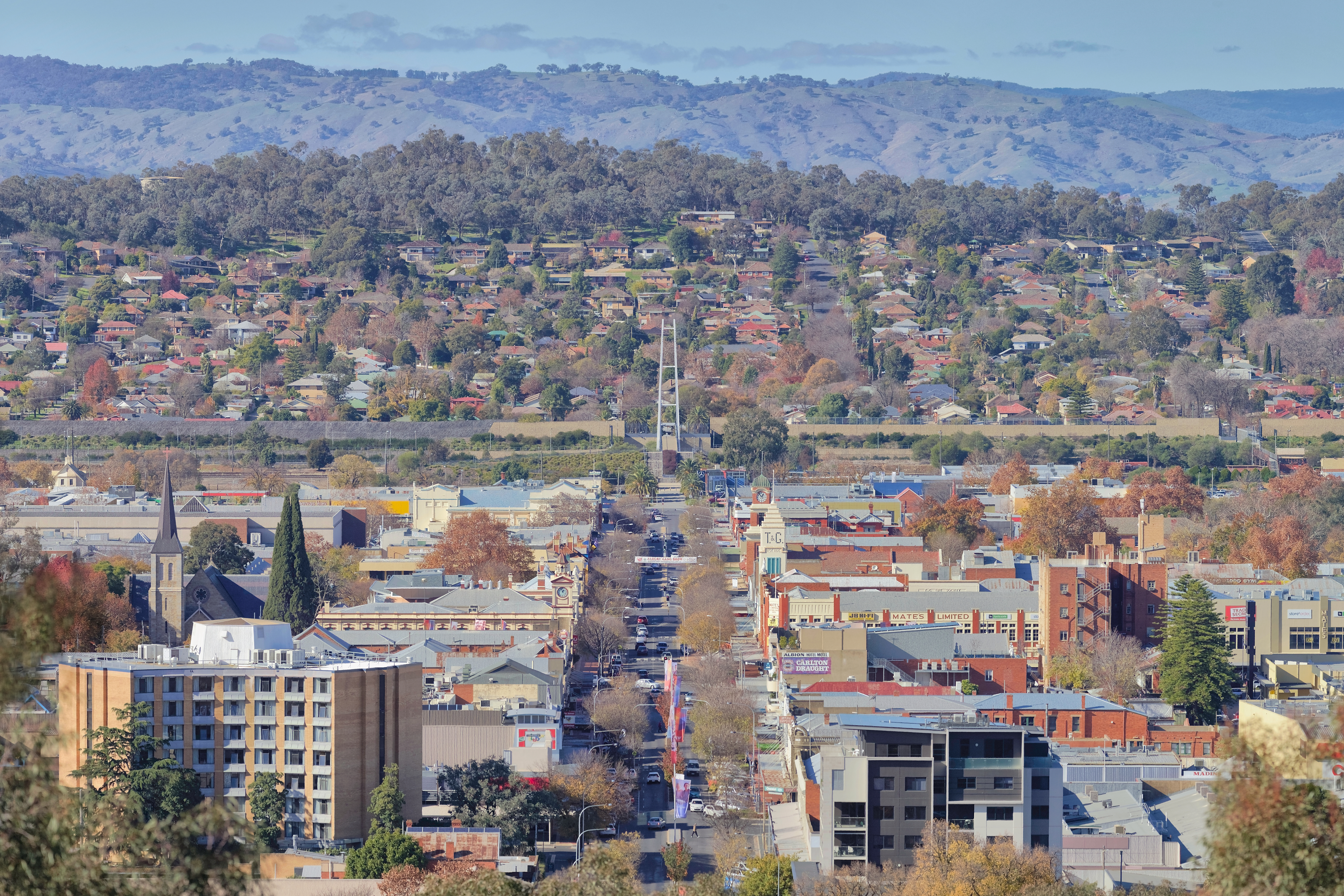
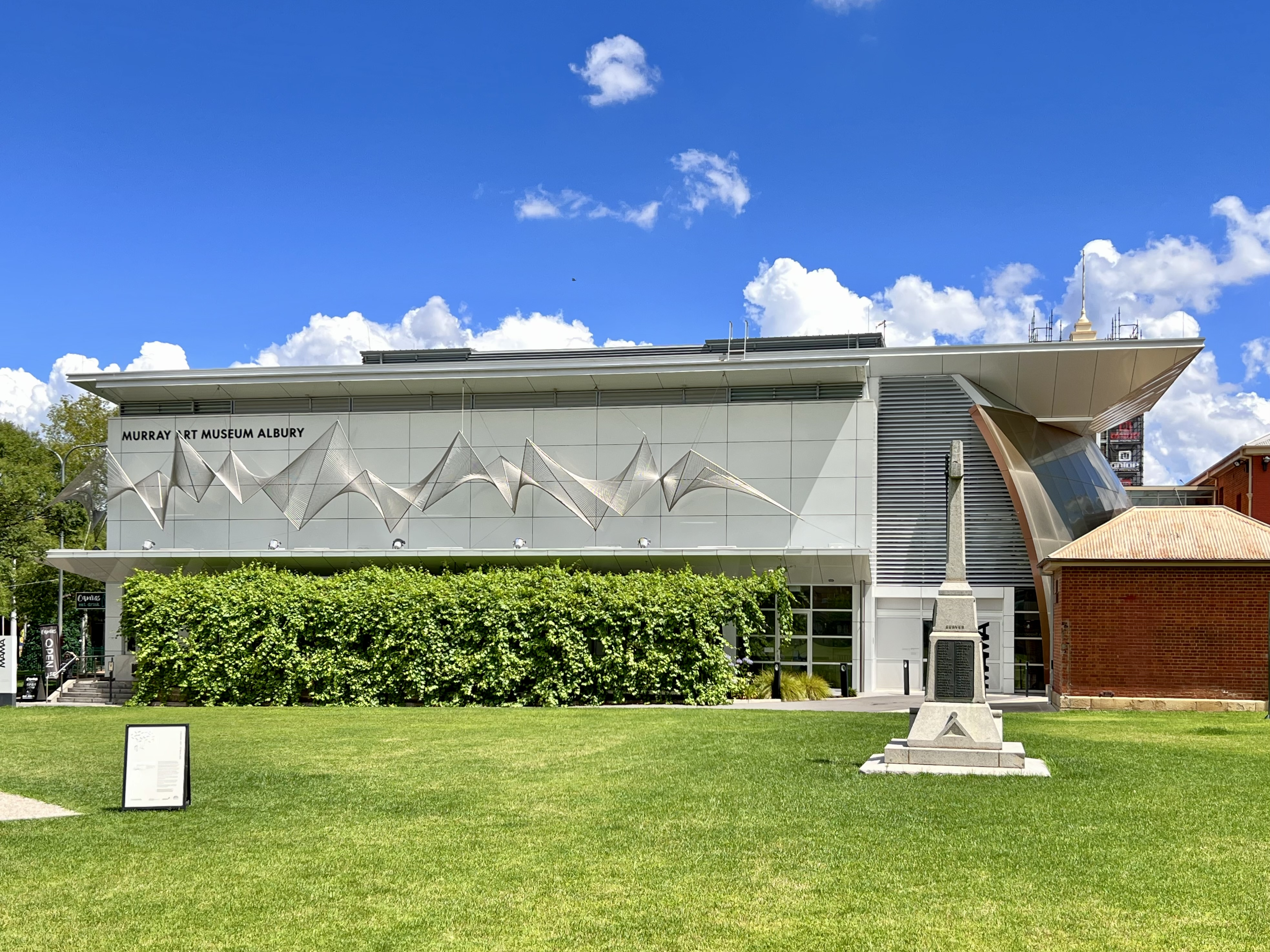
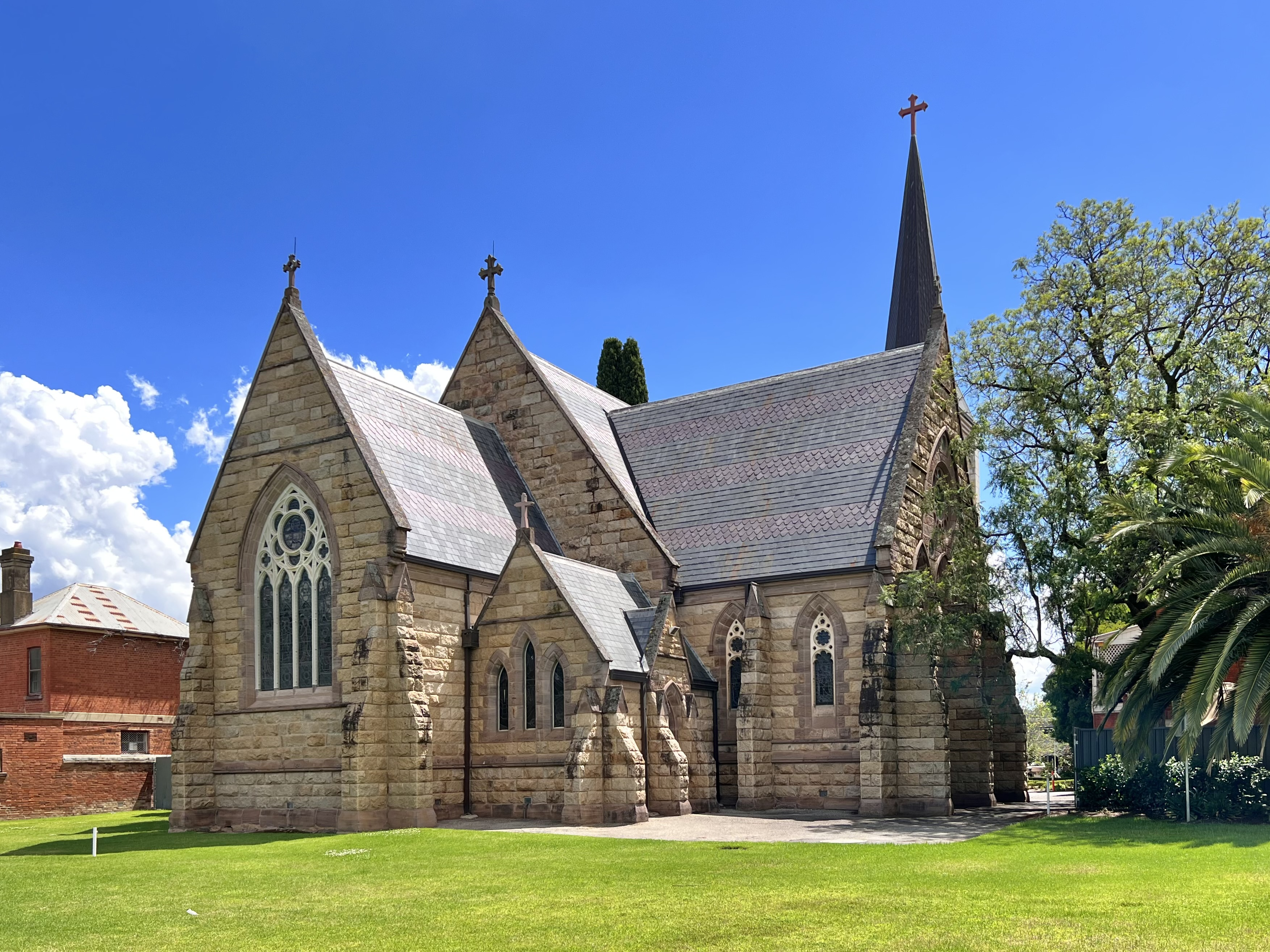
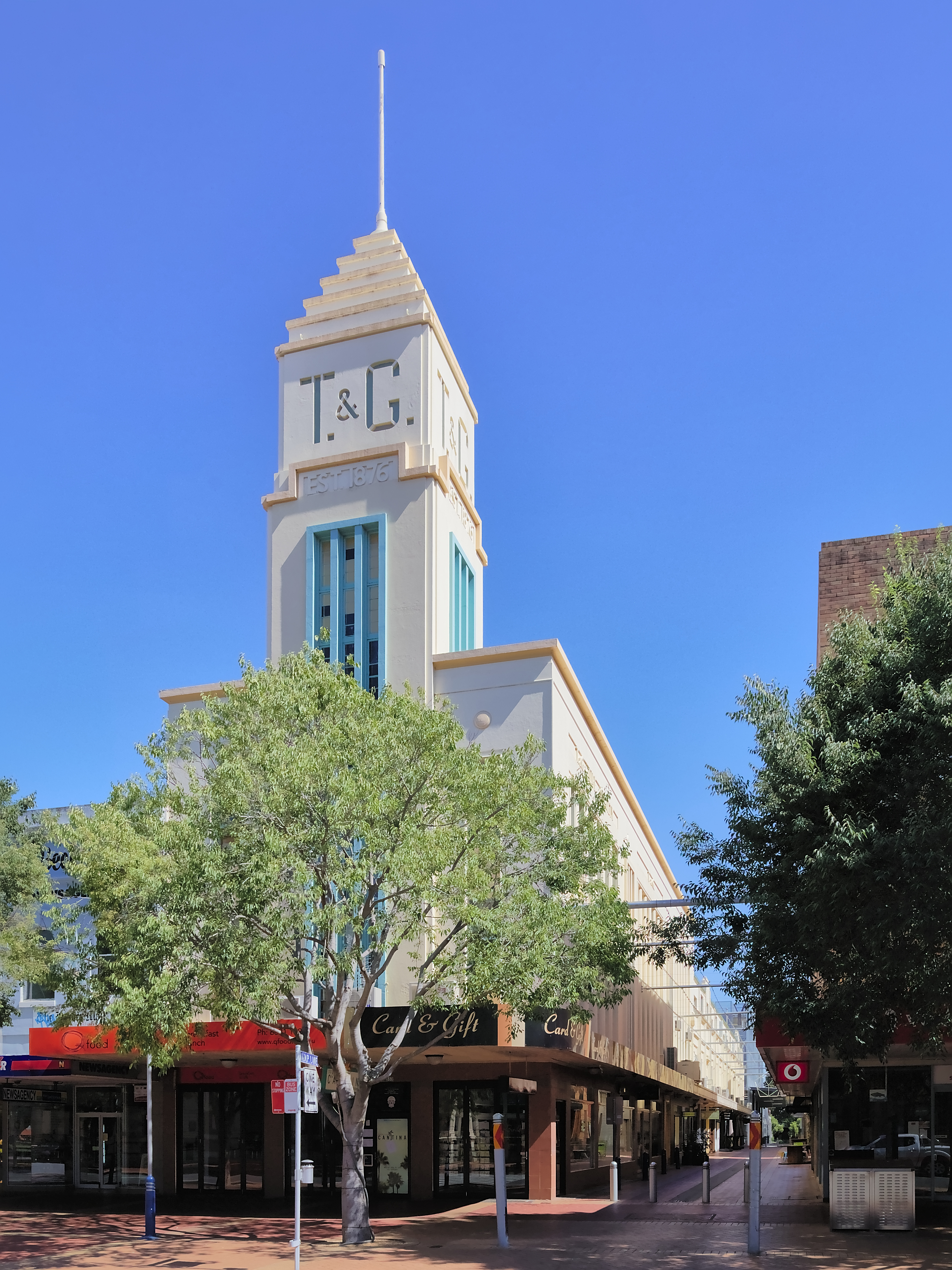
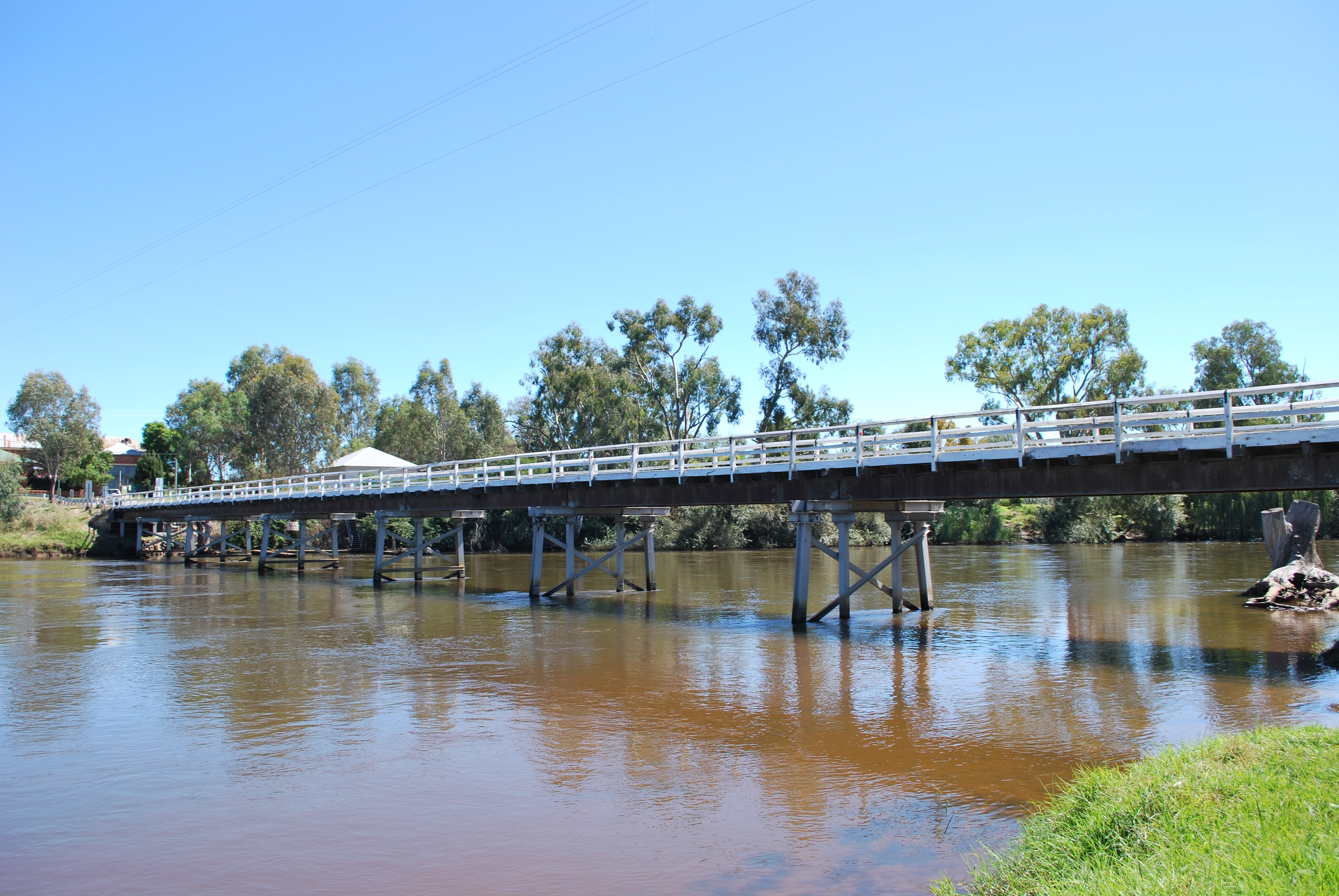
- Albury City Centre from Monument Hill Murray Art Museum Saint Matthew's Anglican Church T&G Building Waterworks Bridge over the Murray River

- Coordinates: 36°04′50″S 146°54′57″E
- Country: Australia
- State: New South Wales
- LGA: City of Albury
- Location: 554 km (344 mi) from Sydney; 326 km (203 mi) from Melbourne; 341 km (212 mi) from Canberra; 128 km (80 mi) from Wagga Wagga; 7.7 km (4.8 mi) from Wodonga
- Established: 1839; 1946 (city)

Government
  - State electorate: Albury
  - Federal division: Farrer
- Elevation: 165.0 m (541.3 ft)

Population
  - Total: 53,677 (UCL 2021)
- Time zone: UTC+10 (AEST)
  - Summer (DST): UTC+11 (AEDT)
- Postcodes: 2640 (city & suburbs); 2641 (Lavington, Springdale Heights)
- County: Goulburn
- Mean max temp: 21.6 °C (70.9 °F)
- Mean min temp: 10.0 °C (50.0 °F)
- Annual rainfall: 699.1 mm (27.52 in)

Albury (/ˈɔːlbəri/ ALL-bree; Wiradjuri: Bungambrawatha) is a major regional city located in the Murray region of New South Wales, Australia. It is part of the twin city of Albury–Wodonga, situated on the Hume Highway and the northern side of the Murray River. Albury is the seat of local government for the council area which also bears the city's name – the City of Albury. It is on the Victoria–New South Wales border.

Albury has an urban population of 53,677 and is separated from its twin city in Victoria, Wodonga, by the Murray River. Together, the two cities form an urban area with a population of 97,793 in 2021. It is 554 kilometres (344 mi) from the state capital Sydney and 326 kilometres (203 mi) from the Victorian capital Melbourne.

Said to be named after a village in England, United Kingdom, Albury developed as a major transport link between New South Wales and Victoria and was proclaimed a city in 1946.

== History ==
The Wiradjuri (Wiradjuri northern dialect pronunciation [wiraːjd̪uːraj]) or Wirraayjuurray people (Wiradjuri southern dialect pronunciation [wiraːjɟuːraj]) people were the first known humans to occupy the area. They are a group of indigenous Australian Aboriginal people that were united by a common language and strong ties of kinship, who survived as skilled hunter–fisher–gatherers in family groups or clans scattered throughout central New South Wales.

In the 21st century, major Wiradjuri groups live in Condobolin, Peak Hill, Narrandera and Griffith. There are significant populations at Wagga Wagga and Leeton and smaller groups at West Wyalong, Parkes, Dubbo, Forbes, Cootamundra, Cowra and Young.

=== European exploration ===
During their expedition, the explorers Hamilton Hume and William Hovell arrived at what their maps called 'Crossing Point', but is now known as the Murray River at Albury, on 16 November 1824. They named the river the Hume River, after Hume's father, and the next day inscribed a tree by the river bank before continuing their journey south to Westernport in Victoria. In 1830, explorer Captain Charles Sturt discovered the Hume River downstream at its junction with the Murrumbidgee River. Not realising it was the same river, he named it the Murray River. Both names persisted for some time, Hume falling into disuse eventually in favour of Murray. The Aboriginal name for the river was Millewa. A crossing place for the Murray became popular close to where Hovell inscribed the tree. In summer it was usually possible to cross the river by foot.

=== British settlement ===
Among the first squatters to follow in the steps of the explorers and settle in the district were William Wyse and Charles Ebden.

The first European buildings erected at the crossing place were a provisions store and some small huts. A survey for a town was commissioned in 1838 by Assistant Surveyor Thomas Scott Townsend, who mapped out Wodonga Place (the present Wodonga Place) as the western boundary, Hume Street as the northern boundary, Kiewa Street to the east and Nurigong Street to the south, with Townsend Street being the only other north–south road, and Ebden and Hovell Streets being the two other east–west roads. Townsend proposed the settlement be named "Bungambrawatha", the Aboriginal name for the area, but when his plan was eventually approved and published in the Government Gazette on 13 April 1839 the name had been changed to Albury.

Albury is said to be named after a village in Kent, England, which it apparently resembled, though that referenced publication seems incorrect since there is no Albury in Kent. More plausible is Albury in adjacent Surrey, straddling the River Tillingbourne and a significant 18th-century site of mills and industry.

=== Frontier town ===
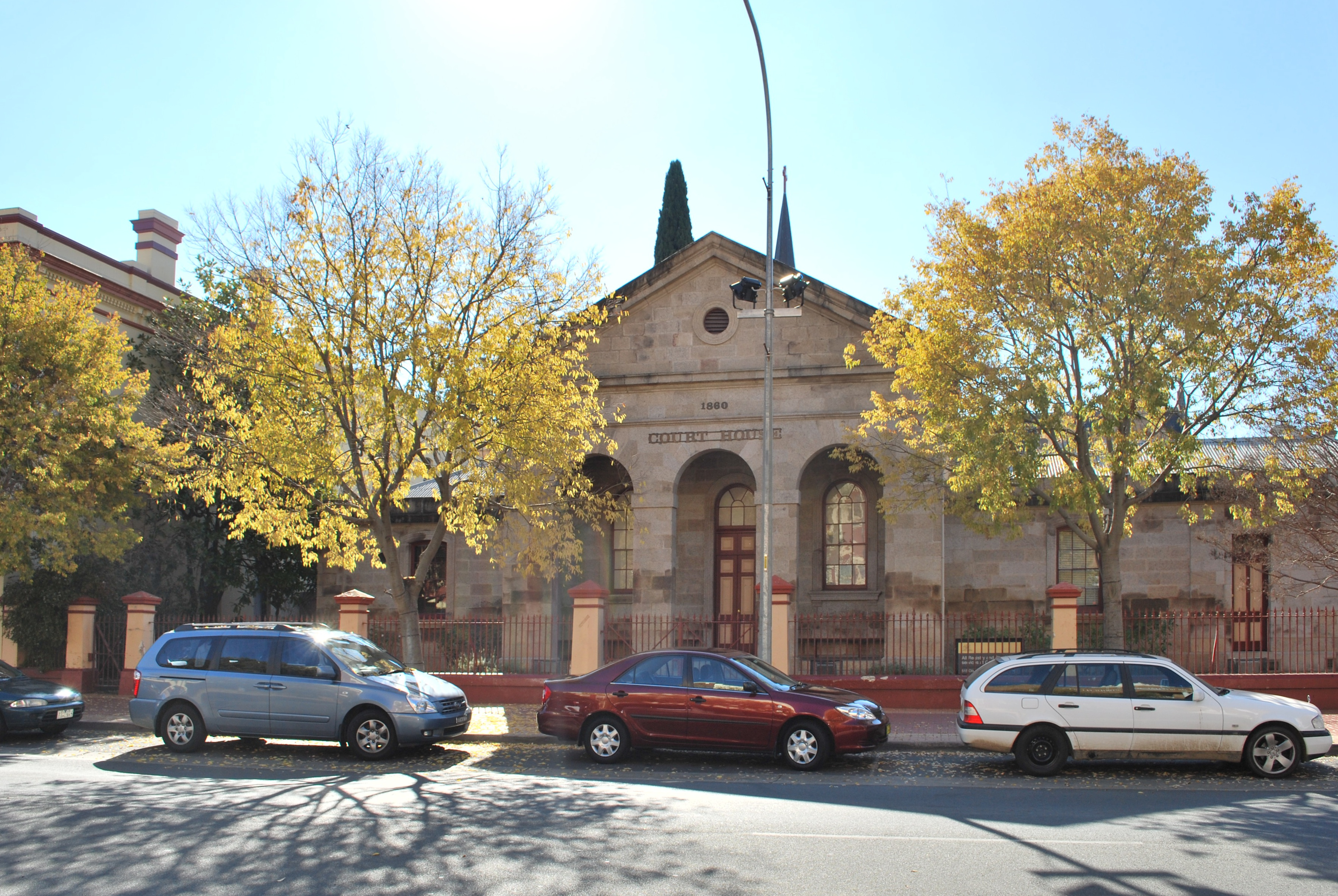
The historic Albury Court House was completed in 1860

By 1847, the Albury settlement included two public houses and a handful of huts, a police barracks and a blacksmith. A log punt established in 1844 serviced the crossing of the Murray River. Albury Post Office opened on 1 April 1843, closed in 1845, then reopened in the township on 1 February 1847.

In 1851, with the separation of Victoria from New South Wales, and the border falling on the Murray River, Albury found itself a frontier town. With an increase in commerce with Melbourne, the first bridge was built in 1860 to the design of surveyor William Snell Chauncy. Albury at this time became a customs post between the two colonies as New South Wales held a protectionist stance after gaining its constitution in 1856.

Albury was at this time starting to grow substantially with German-speaking immigrants using the area to grow grapes for wine. By the 1870s a butter factory was established. A flour mill, wineries and locally brewed cider and soft drinks were also available.

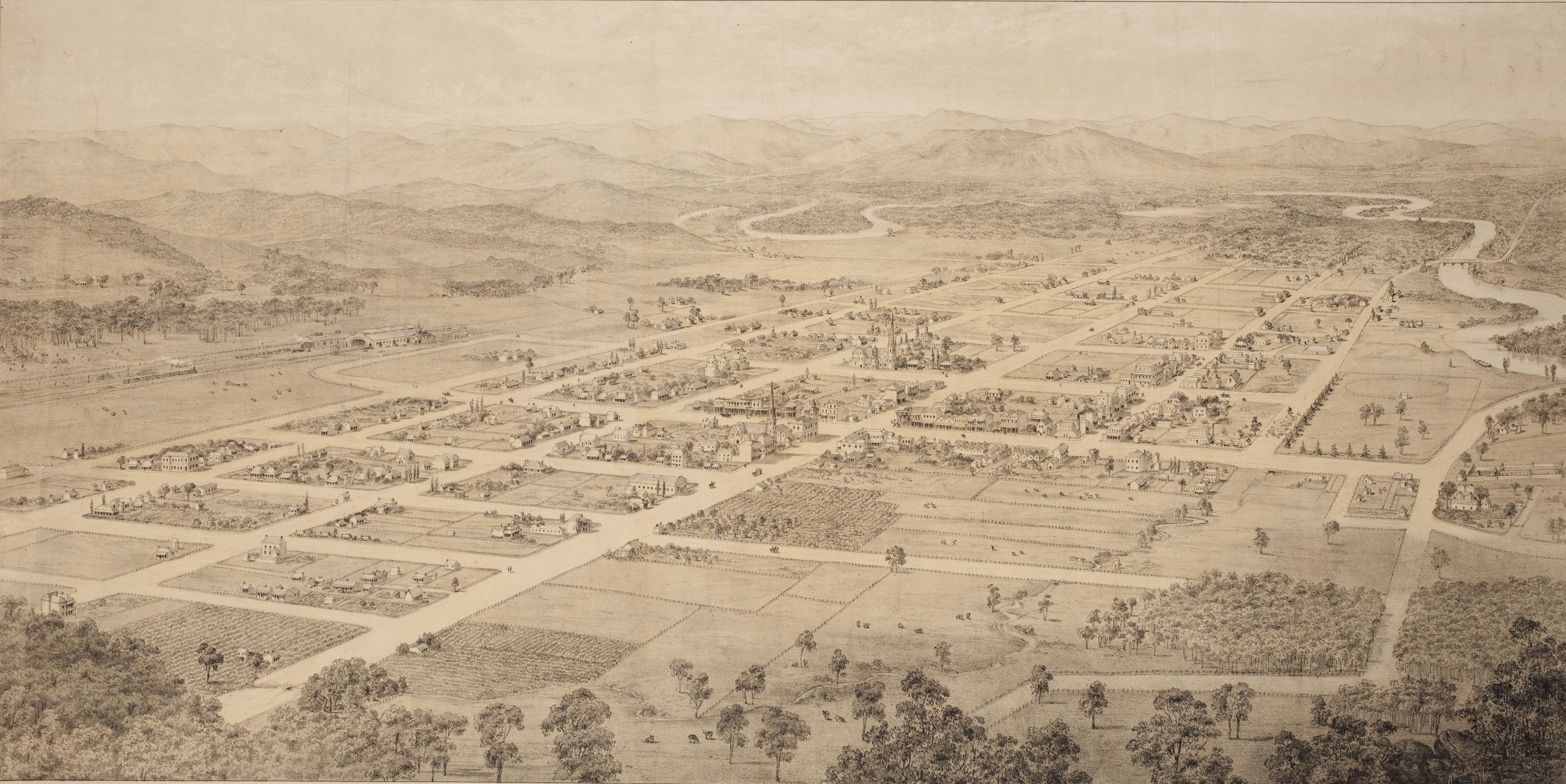
Birds-eye view of Albury, New South Wales, 1881, by Gibbs, Shallard, & Co.

The railway line from Sydney arrived at Albury in 1881 (see Transport-Rail below). The North-Eastern Railway line from Melbourne to Wodonga was completed in 1873, and a wooden railway bridge connected the Albury Railway Station to the Victorian line in 1883. New South Wales and Victoria had different track gauges until 1962, when the first train ran directly from Sydney to Melbourne. The two states could not initially agree which should be the transfer point, so they had an expensive and attractive iron lattice bridge sent from Scotland which accommodated both gauges.

There was a school operating at Albury in 1848, catering to 13 private students. The following year the first National School opened on the corner of Dean and Kiewa Streets, with 73 students enrolled. In 1862 a new school was built on Olive Street on land which is now part of Albury Public School. The city's first mayor, James Fallon, was an innovator of the Public School, funding a demonstration high school to be built on Kiewa Street. Albury High School opened in Kiewa Street in 1927.

=== 20th-century city ===
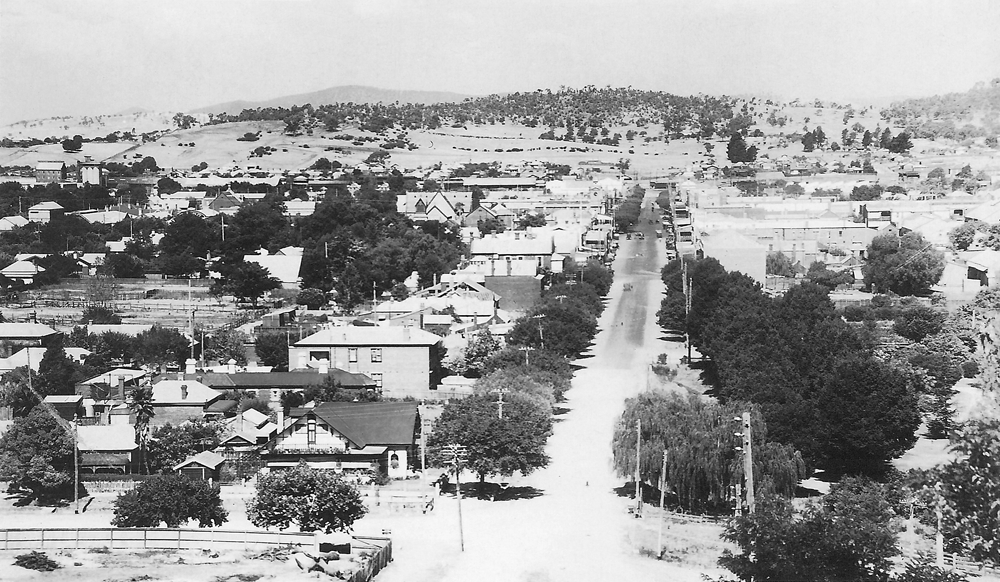
Overlooking Albury from Monument Hill in the 1920s

The Royal Commission on Sites for the Seat of Government of the Commonwealth report of 1903 recommended Albury (along with Tumut) as the preferred candidate for the national capital, though the proposal met staunch opposition from residents. At a public meeting, just one member of parliament voted in favour of Albury – Isaac Isaacs, member for Indi. The lack of support for other places ultimately led to the selection of Canberra as the preferred site.

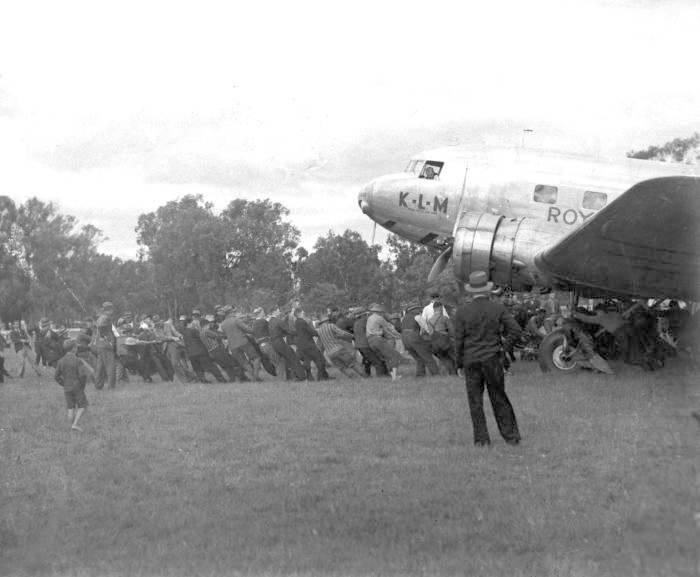
The Uiver being pulled out of the mud after its emergency landing in Albury in 1934

In 1934, a Douglas DC-2 airliner of KLM (the "Uiver"), a competitor in the MacRobertson Trophy Air Race (also known as the London to Melbourne Air Race), made an emergency night landing at the town's racecourse after becoming lost during severe thunderstorms. After signalling by Morse code A-L-B-U-R-Y to the lost aircrew by using the entire town's public lighting system, the "Uiver" was guided in to land safely. The makeshift runway at the racecourse was illuminated by the headlights of cars belonging to local residents who had responded to a special news bulletin on ABC radio station 2CO. The next morning many local volunteers helped pull the stranded aircraft out of the mud and the aircraft was able to take off and continue to Melbourne where it won first prize in the race's handicap category and was second overall.

Albury and Wodonga played a military role in World War II with the establishment of ordnance bases at Bandiana and Bonegilla. Proclaimed a city in 1946, Albury played a role in the post-war immigration to Australia with the establishment nearby of Australia's first migrant centre, the Bonegilla Migrant Reception and Training Centre in 1947.

Albury's proximity to Wodonga has spurred several efforts to achieve some kind of municipal governmental union (see Albury-Wodonga). In 1973, Albury-Wodonga was selected as the primary focus of the Whitlam federal government's scheme to redirect the uncontrolled growth of Australia's large coastal cities (Sydney and Melbourne in particular) by encouraging decentralisation. Grand plans were made to turn Albury-Wodonga into a major inland city and large areas of the surrounding farmland were compulsorily purchased by a government agency, the Albury Wodonga Development Corporation. Some industries were enticed to move there, and a certain amount of population movement resulted. However, the current urban population is approximately 92,200.

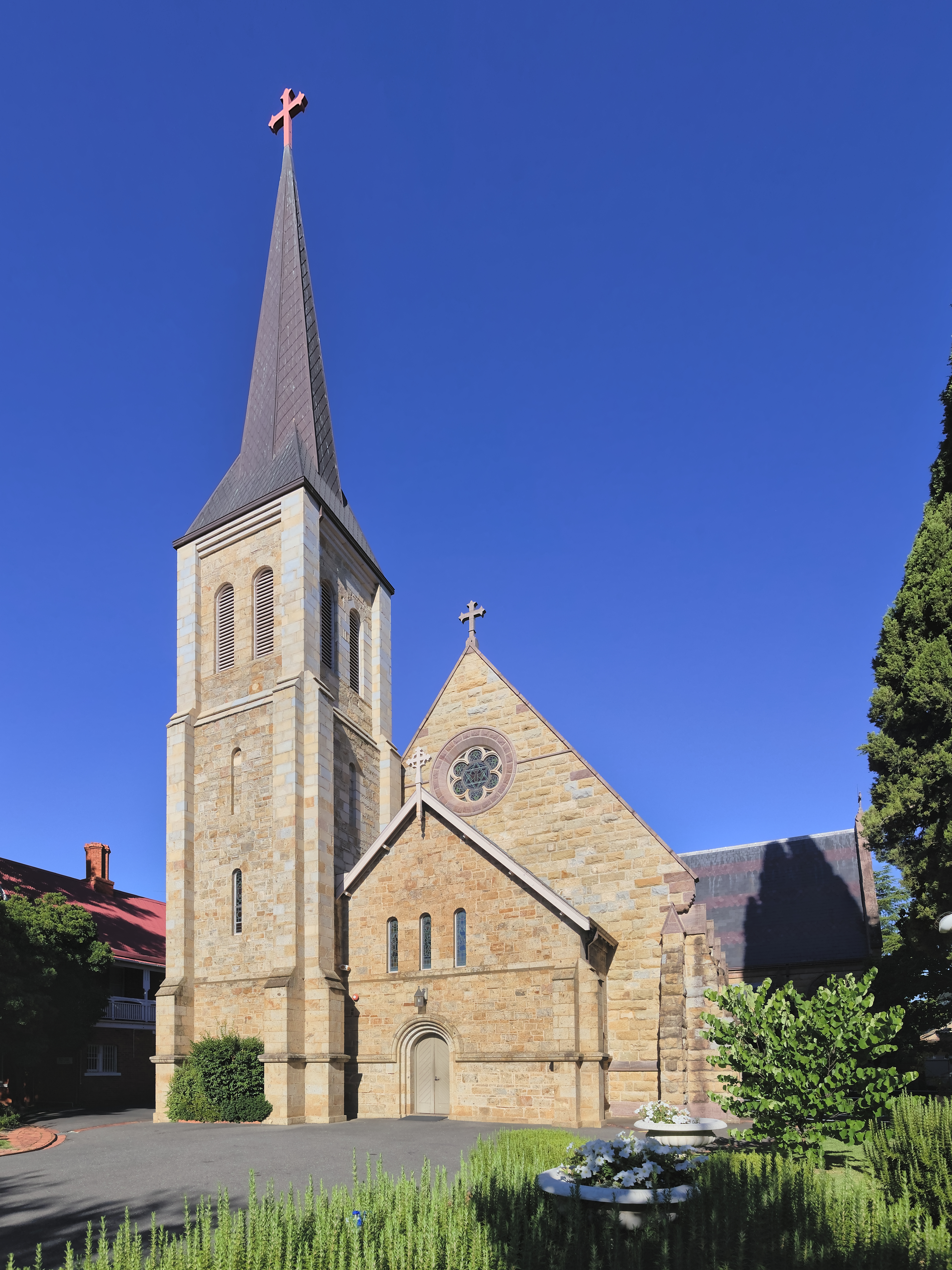
St Matthew's Anglican Church

== Population ==
Historical population
Year	Pop.	±%
1921	7,751	—
1933	10,543	+36.0%
1947	14,412	+36.7%
1954	16,726	+16.1%
1961	18,621	+11.3%
1966	23,379	+25.6%
1971	27,403	+17.2%
1976	31,954	+16.6%
1981	35,072	+9.8%
1986	37,164	+6.0%
1991	39,975	+7.6%
1996	41,491	+3.8%
2001	42,005	+1.2%
2006	43,787	+4.2%
2011	45,627	+4.2%
2016	47,974	+5.1%
2021	53,677	+11.9%
Source: Australian Bureau of Statistics data.

According to the 2021 census of Population, there were 53,677 people in the Albury part of the Albury-Wodonga Urban Centre.

- Aboriginal and Torres Strait Islander people made up 2.9% of the population.
- 81.2% of people were born in Australia. The next most common countries of birth were England 1.9%, India 1.2%, New Zealand 1.0%, Philippines 0.6% and Bhutan 0.6%.
- 86.0% of people spoke only English at home. Other languages spoken at home included Nepali 1.1%, Punjabi 0.6%, Mandarin 0.3%, Greek 0.3% and Hindi 0.3%.
- The most common responses for religion were No Religion 27.7%, Catholic 25.4% and Anglican 16.7%.

== Climate and geography ==
Albury is situated above the river flats of the Murray River, in the foothills of the Great Dividing Range. At the city's airport, Albury is 164 metres (538 ft) above sea level.

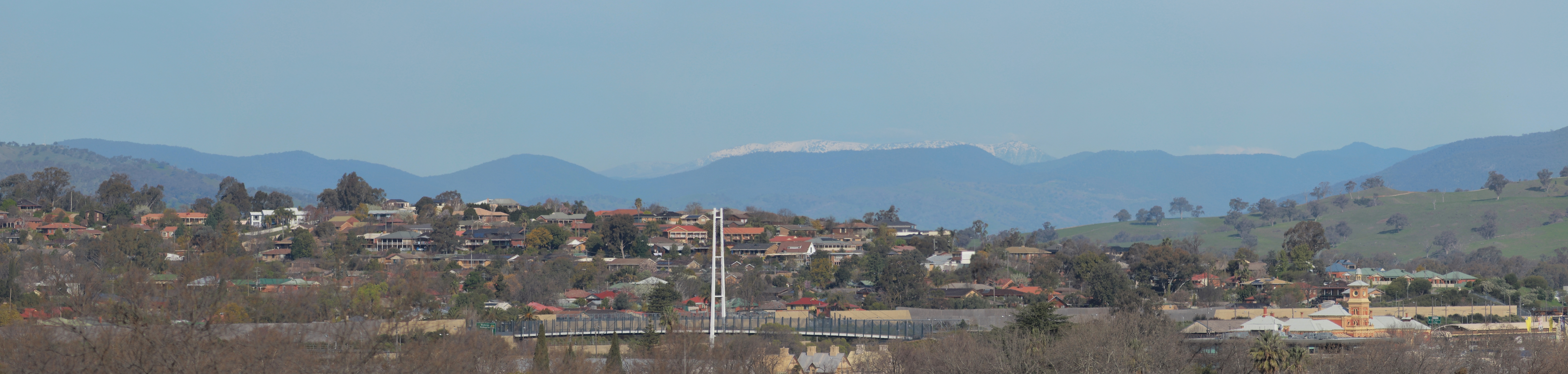
Alpine areas such as Mount Bogong are visible from Albury on clear days.

=== Climate ===
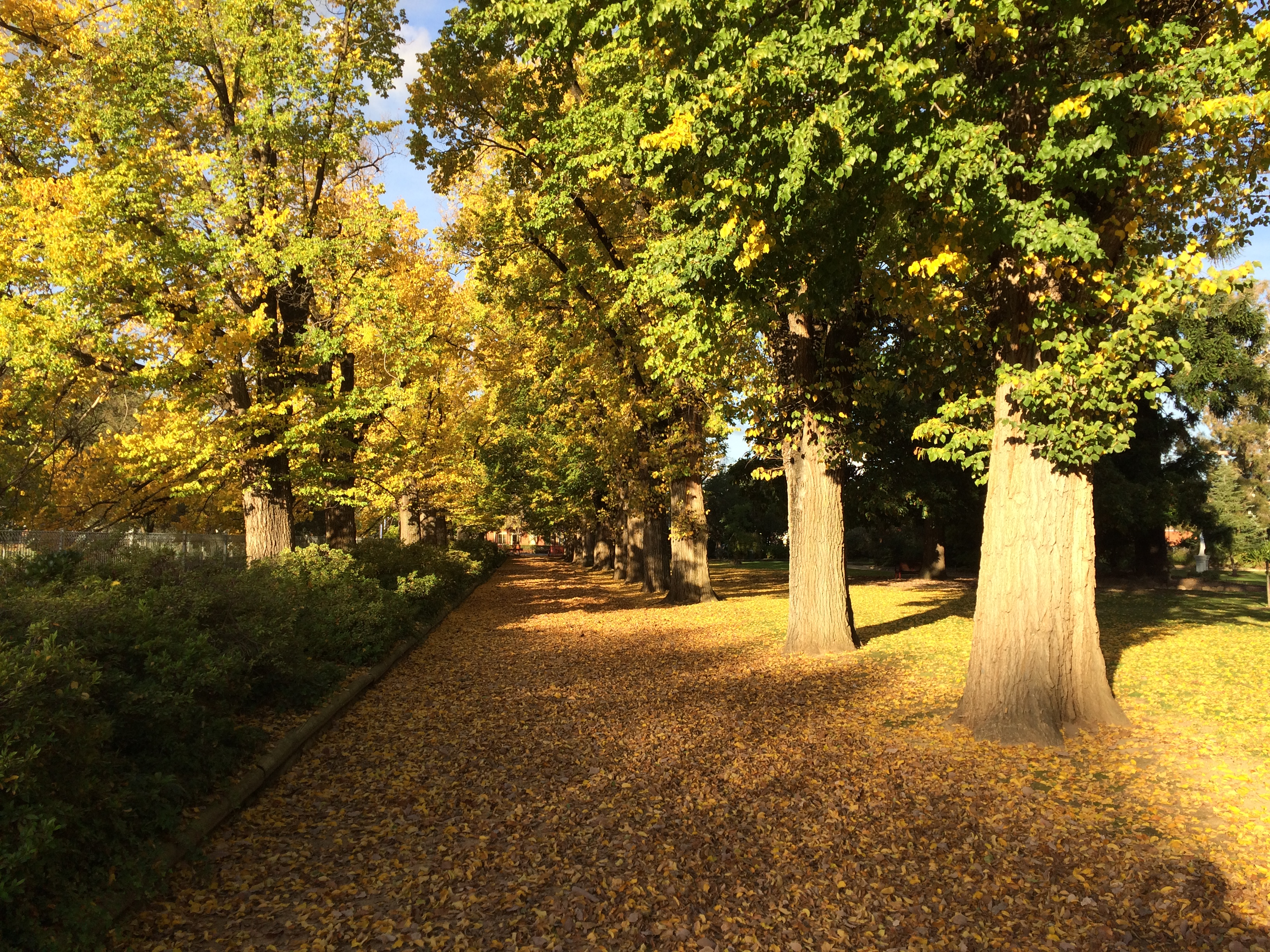
The Albury Botanic Gardens in autumn

Albury has a mild, temperate climate, with cool, damp winters and warm to hot, mostly dry, summers. Under the Köppen climate classification, Albury has a humid subtropical climate (Cfa), but would have tendencies of a Mediterranean climate (Csa) as well.

In high summer, the mean daily maximum temperature is 31 °C (88 °F) with low humidity; however, this is subject to substantial daily variation. An average of 17 days with a maximum above 35 °C (95 °F) occur in this summer period, with many cooler days. Mean mid winter maxima are 12 °C (54 °F) with many cloudy days, and is likewise the wettest season. Albury gets approximately 20 days per year featuring minima of below freezing, though the cloud cover tends to limit frost. Sleet may occur during the winter months, but settling snowfalls are very rare, with the last significant snowfall in July 1966. The highest temperature recorded at Albury was 46.1 °C on 4 January 2020, and the lowest temperature was −4.0 °C recorded on 8 August 1994 (both at the Airport AWS station).

Albury's mean annual rainfall is 699.1 millimetres (27.52 in). Rainfall peaks distinctly in the winter months with a high mean of 75.9 mm (2.99 in) in July and August, comparing with the February low of 42.1 mm (1.66 in). Albury has quite a high evaporation rate in summer, giving the environment a relatively arid appearance. The city has a high amount of sunshine, getting around 108 days of clear skies annually (with the majority in summer and early autumn). The sunniest month is January, with 14.6 clear days (and 7.7 cloudy days), and the cloudiest month is July, with 17.5 cloudy days (and 3.9 clear days).

Climate data for Albury (Hume Reservoir, 1922–2022, extremes 1965–2022); 184 m AMSL; 36.10° S, 147.03° E
Month	Jan	Feb	Mar	Apr	May	Jun	Jul	Aug	Sep	Oct	Nov	Dec	Year
Record high °C (°F)	45.5 (113.9)	44.9 (112.8)	39.2 (102.6)	34.8 (94.6)	28.2 (82.8)	21.6 (70.9)	21.3 (70.3)	24.3 (75.7)	30.7 (87.3)	35.2 (95.4)	40.5 (104.9)	42.1 (107.8)	45.5 (113.9)
Mean daily maximum °C (°F)	30.9 (87.6)	30.5 (86.9)	27.1 (80.8)	21.8 (71.2)	16.8 (62.2)	13.1 (55.6)	12.3 (54.1)	14.2 (57.6)	17.4 (63.3)	21.1 (70.0)	25.1 (77.2)	28.7 (83.7)	21.6 (70.9)
Mean daily minimum °C (°F)	16.7 (62.1)	16.6 (61.9)	13.9 (57.0)	10.1 (50.2)	7.0 (44.6)	4.8 (40.6)	4.1 (39.4)	4.9 (40.8)	6.7 (44.1)	9.2 (48.6)	11.8 (53.2)	14.5 (58.1)	10.0 (50.1)
Record low °C (°F)	6.8 (44.2)	6.7 (44.1)	3.6 (38.5)	1.1 (34.0)	−1.7 (28.9)	−2.7 (27.1)	−2.8 (27.0)	−2.3 (27.9)	−1.8 (28.8)	1.2 (34.2)	2.8 (37.0)	4.4 (39.9)	−2.8 (27.0)
Average precipitation mm (inches)	50.5 (1.99)	42.1 (1.66)	47.2 (1.86)	51.8 (2.04)	58.6 (2.31)	67.5 (2.66)	75.9 (2.99)	75.9 (2.99)	61.5 (2.42)	67.7 (2.67)	55.2 (2.17)	49.3 (1.94)	699.1 (27.52)
Average precipitation days (≥ 0.2 mm)	5.6	5.3	5.8	7.2	10.3	12.6	14.4	13.8	11.2	10.2	8.2	6.7	111.3
Mean monthly sunshine hours	313.1	282.5	272.8	228.0	161.2	120.0	127.1	173.6	207.0	260.4	276.0	288.3	2,710
Source 1: Bureau of Meteorology (Hume Reservoir, 1922–2022)
Source 2: Rutherglen Research (sunshine hours, 1975–1998)

=== Albury Airport AWS (1993–2022) ===
The airport is a more sheltered site than the reservoir, generally attaining greater maximum temperatures but also lower minima. Rainfall is lower across the board.

Climate data for Albury Airport AWS (1993–2022); 164 m AMSL; 36.07° S, 146.95° E
Month	Jan	Feb	Mar	Apr	May	Jun	Jul	Aug	Sep	Oct	Nov	Dec	Year
Record high °C (°F)	46.1 (115.0)	44.8 (112.6)	38.5 (101.3)	34.6 (94.3)	28.8 (83.8)	21.8 (71.2)	20.5 (68.9)	24.3 (75.7)	29.5 (85.1)	36.0 (96.8)	41.8 (107.2)	43.2 (109.8)	46.1 (115.0)
Mean daily maximum °C (°F)	32.4 (90.3)	31.1 (88.0)	27.7 (81.9)	22.6 (72.7)	17.6 (63.7)	14.0 (57.2)	13.2 (55.8)	14.9 (58.8)	18.0 (64.4)	21.9 (71.4)	26.1 (79.0)	29.5 (85.1)	22.4 (72.4)
Mean daily minimum °C (°F)	16.8 (62.2)	16.2 (61.2)	13.0 (55.4)	8.5 (47.3)	5.5 (41.9)	3.7 (38.7)	3.1 (37.6)	3.6 (38.5)	5.6 (42.1)	8.2 (46.8)	11.7 (53.1)	14.0 (57.2)	9.2 (48.5)
Record low °C (°F)	6.0 (42.8)	6.8 (44.2)	4.3 (39.7)	0.6 (33.1)	−2.4 (27.7)	−3.7 (25.3)	−3.5 (25.7)	−4.0 (24.8)	−1.9 (28.6)	−0.5 (31.1)	2.4 (36.3)	4.5 (40.1)	−4.0 (24.8)
Average precipitation mm (inches)	54.6 (2.15)	42.5 (1.67)	45.3 (1.78)	40.6 (1.60)	52.2 (2.06)	62.0 (2.44)	65.1 (2.56)	66.6 (2.62)	58.2 (2.29)	52.3 (2.06)	66.5 (2.62)	41.9 (1.65)	643.1 (25.32)
Average precipitation days (≥ 0.2 mm)	6.2	5.1	5.4	6.2	9.7	14.2	16.3	14.0	10.7	8.4	8.3	6.5	111.0
Average afternoon relative humidity (%)	28	33	34	41	54	64	64	57	53	45	39	30	45
Source: Bureau of Meteorology

== Governance ==
Mayor of Albury
- Incumbent; Kevin Mack since 14 October 2024
- Style: Councillor
- Member of: Albury City Council
- Formation: 1859
- First holder: James T Fallon

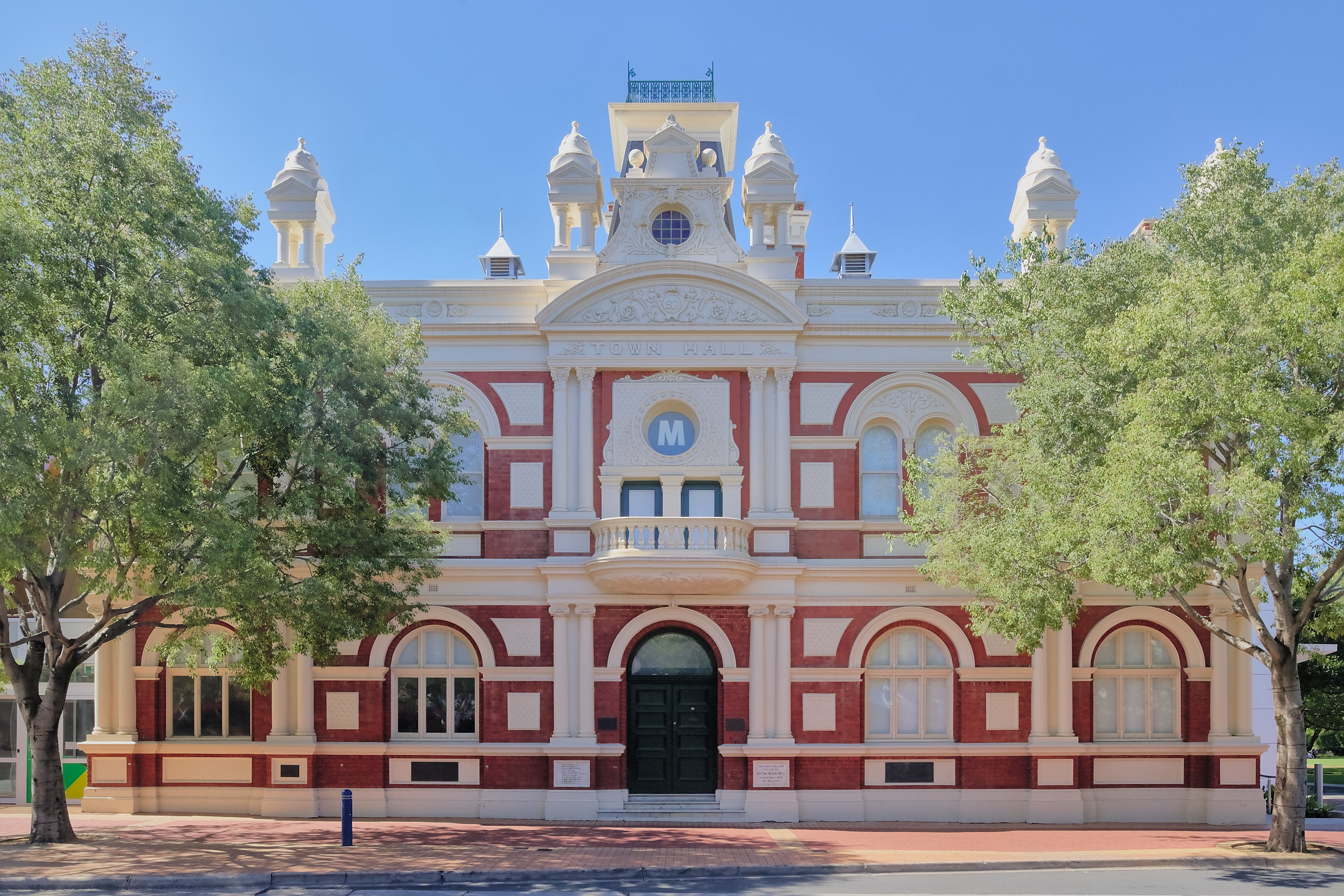
The former Albury Town Hall

Albury is the largest city in the Federal electorate of Farrer, whose current representative is David Farley of One Nation. The previous Federal MP was Sussan Ley, who was the Leader of the Opposition. Leader of the Opposition of Australia . In State politics, the Electoral district of Albury is currently represented by Justin Clancy, also of the Liberal Party. The member for Albury between 1932 and 1946, Alexander Mair, was the Premier of New South Wales from 1939 to 1941.

Local government is the responsibility of the Albury City Council, whose area of responsibility has gradually been enlarged to cover new housing estates on the city's fringes. Amanda Duncan-Strelec became Albury's first female Mayor in 1995, serving for one year. The current mayor of Albury is Kevin Mack.

Albury has a longstanding connection to conservative politics. Following the first convention in Canberra to form the Liberal Party of Australia, delegates, including Sir Robert Menzies, met for a second conference in Albury at Mate's Department Store between 14 and 16 December 1944. The delegates agreed on the structure of the party organisation, adopted a provisional constitution and appointed a federal executive until one could be formally elected.

== City and suburbs ==
The city has a number of suburbs.

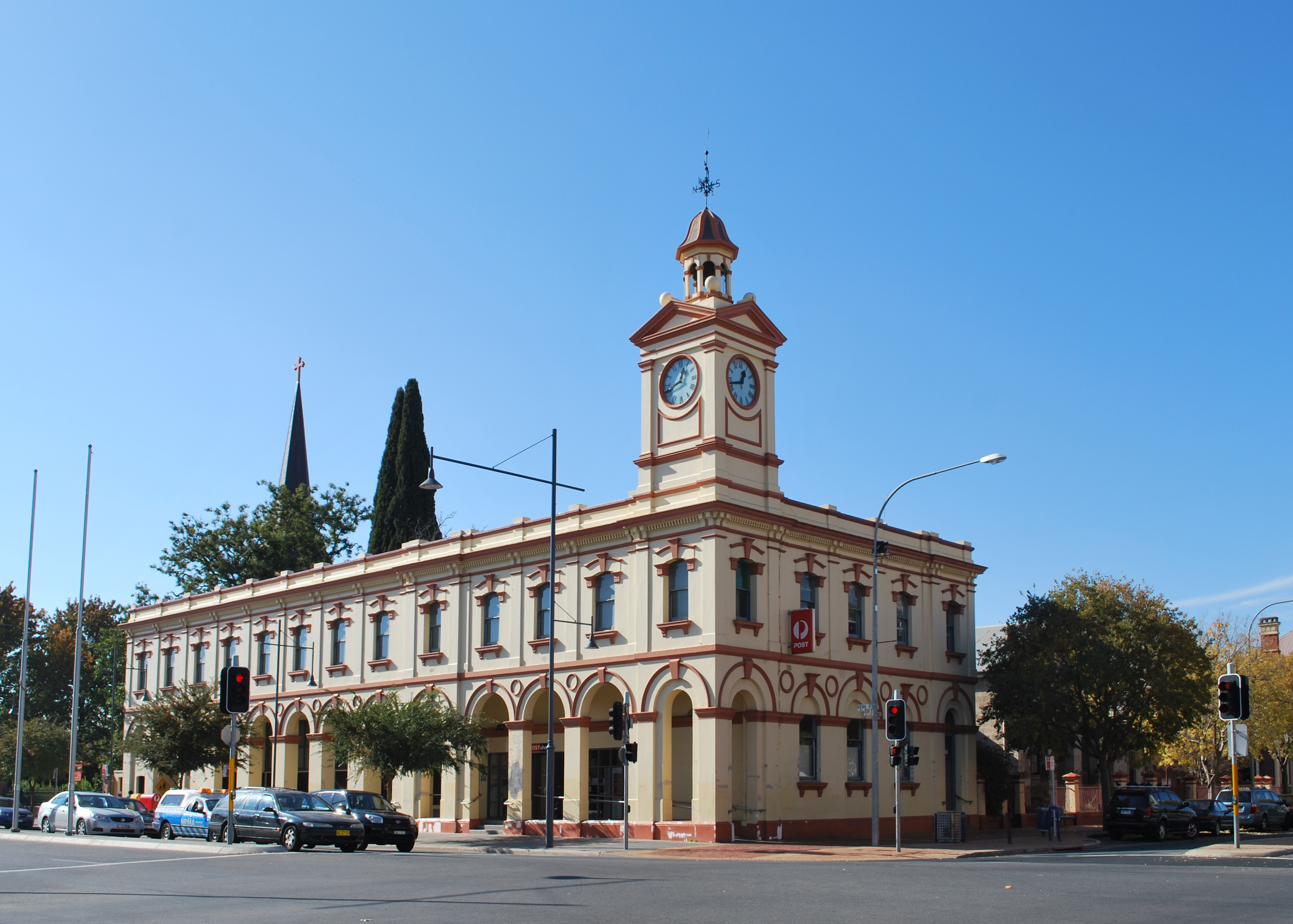
The Albury Post Office in the city centre

Central Albury comprises the central business district (CBD) and lies between the railway line, the Murray River and Monument Hill. Much commercial activity is concentrated here, with Dean Street forming the axis of the main shopping and office district. A cultural precinct is centred on QEII Square, which includes the Albury Library Museum, Murray Art Museum Albury (MAMA), Albury Entertainment Centre and Convention Centre, and the Murray Conservatorium. In the same block are the Post Office, Police Station and Courthouse, and St Matthew's Anglican Church (which was rebuilt after being destroyed by fire in 1990). The Albury City Council offices are located on Kiewa Street.

Forrest Hill lies directly north west and covers the saddle between Monument Hill and Nail Can Hill. West over the ridge lies West Albury. West Albury is primarily a residential area, but it is home to the First World War Memorial (locally known as the Monument), Riverwood Retirement Village, Albury Wodonga Private Hospital (which lies on the corner of Pemberton Street and the Riverina Highway), and the Albury sewage treatment plant. All of West Albury was once wetland and bush. The only remnant of this is Horseshoe Lagoon to the south-west of the suburb, which has been declared a Wildlife Refuge by NSW Parks & Wildlife and incorporated into the Wonga Wetlands. To the north-west of West Albury is Pemberton Park.

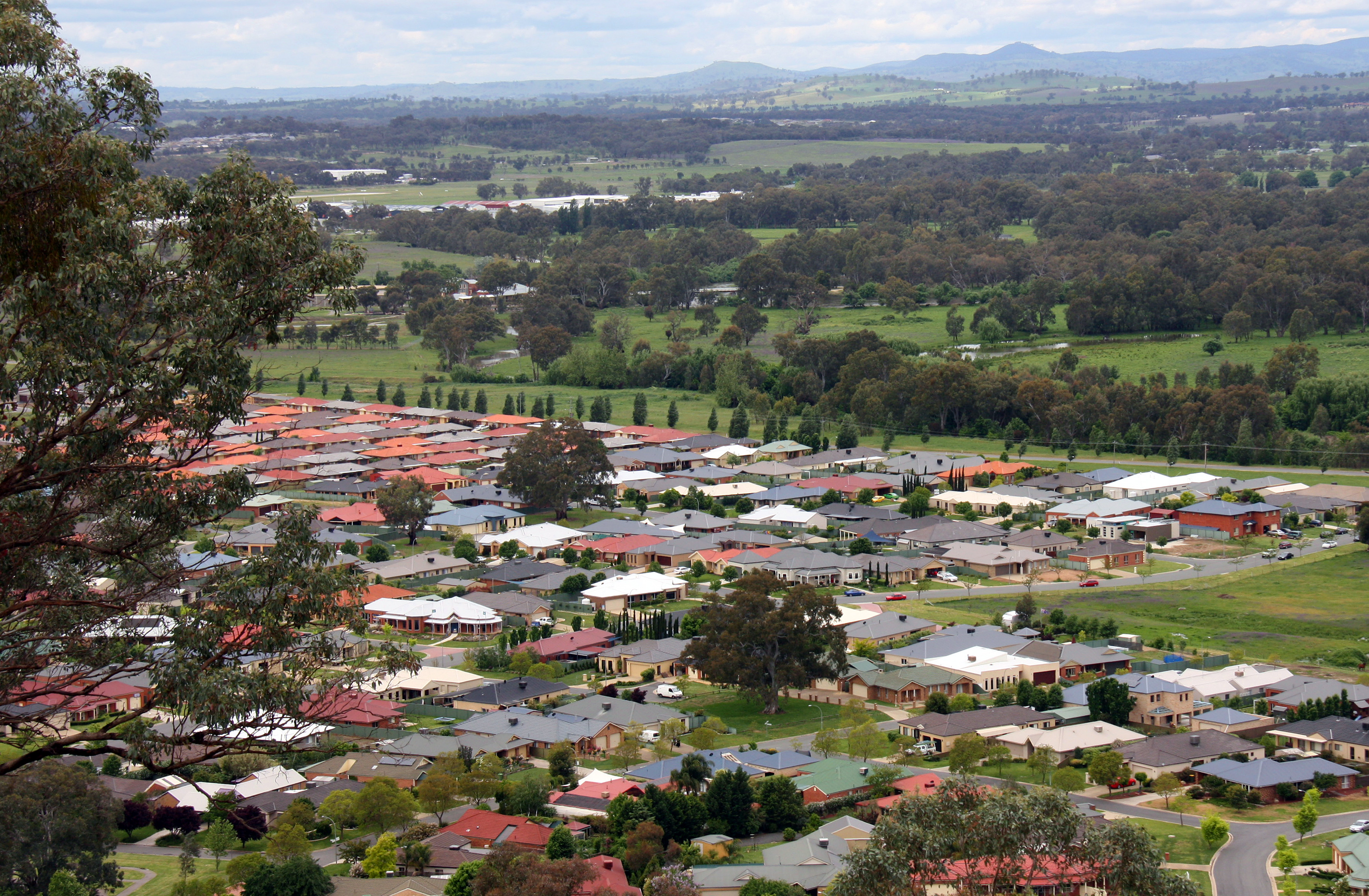
East Albury

East Albury lies east of the railway line/freeway from the CBD and houses now cover the eastern hill alongside the Albury Base Hospital, while the flat land directly north of it is covered by parkland, housing and light industry, and a retail park including Harvey Norman and Spotlight franchises, as well as the city airport. The Mungabareena Reserve lies on the Murray south of the airport, and is considered an Aboriginal cultural site of some significance. Mungabareena means "place of plenty talk" in the Wiradjuri language.

South Albury is a mix of residential and industrial areas, with the floodplains south of the railway line and freeway still used for farming and grazing. Flood mitigation works in the 1990s have dramatically reduced the risk of flooding in this area.

North Albury was covered by orchards and vineyards in the first half of the 20th century, and a swamp existed where James Fallon High School now stands. After the World War II, housing development in the area increased and Waugh Road was extended from David Street to the "Five Ways" intersection at Union Road, which ascribes the border between North Albury and Lavington. The locality of Glenroy is adjacent to North Albury, west of the Bungambrawartha Creek, and housing was developed here in the 1970s, including a significant Housing Commission public housing estate.

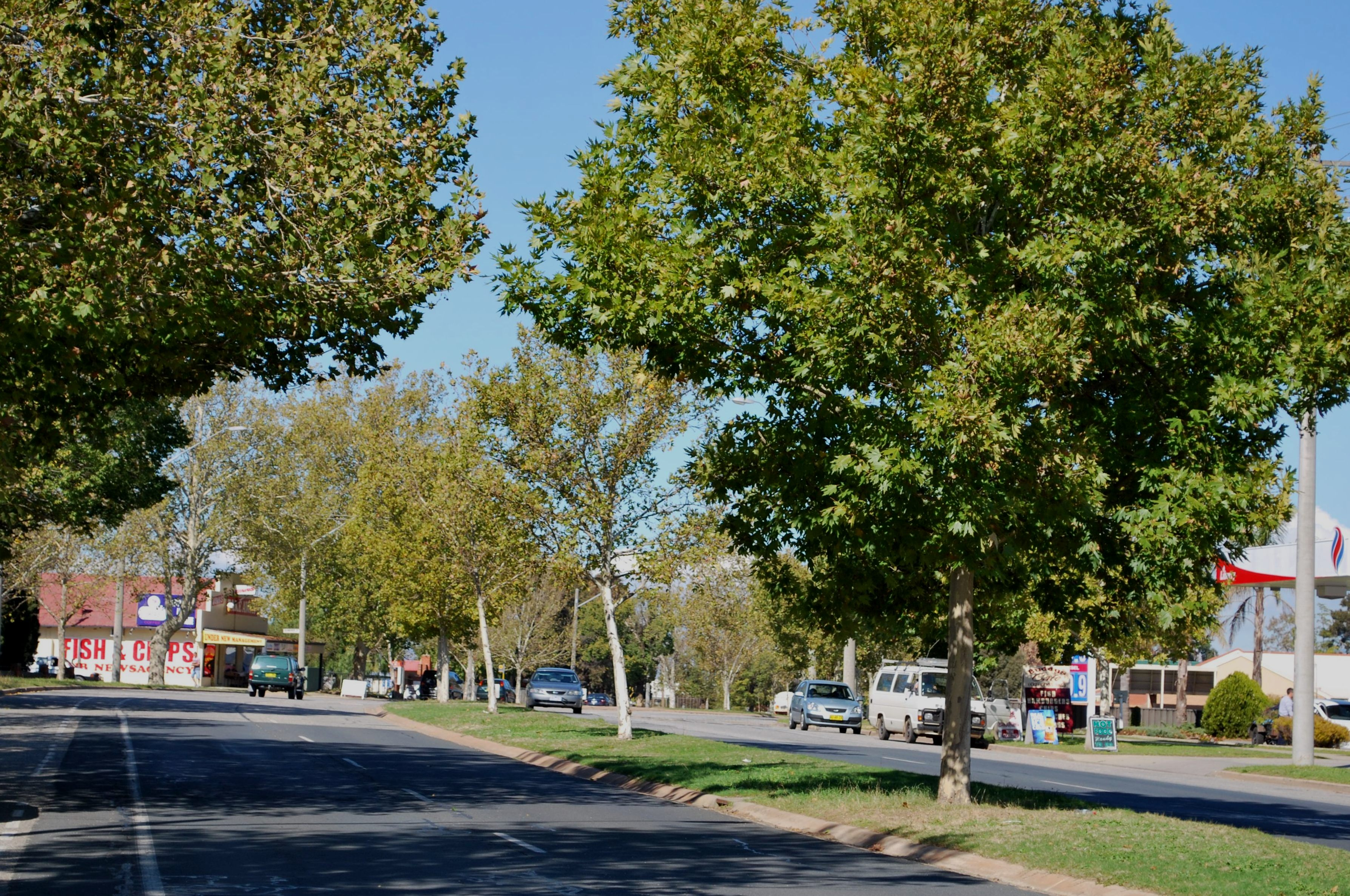
Urana Road, Lavington

Lavington is the largest suburb of Albury, and the only suburb which has its own postcode (2641, as opposed to 2640 for the balance of Albury). The suburb was originally named Black Range in the 1850s and 1860s, before being renamed Lavington in 1910. Originally within the boundaries of Hume Shire, it was absorbed into the City of Albury Local Government Area in the 1950s. Housing and commercial development has continued from that point until this day. Prior to 2007, the Hume Highway – passed north-east through the suburb, with Urana Road passing north-west through the suburb from the "Five Ways" road junction. In 2007, an internal bypass of the Hume Freeway was opened, with the former name of the Hume Highway section officially reverting to the commonly used "Wagga Road". The suburb of Lavington also includes the localities of Springdale Heights, Hamilton Valley and Norris Park. Albury's lawn cemetery and crematorium lies at the western end of Union Road.

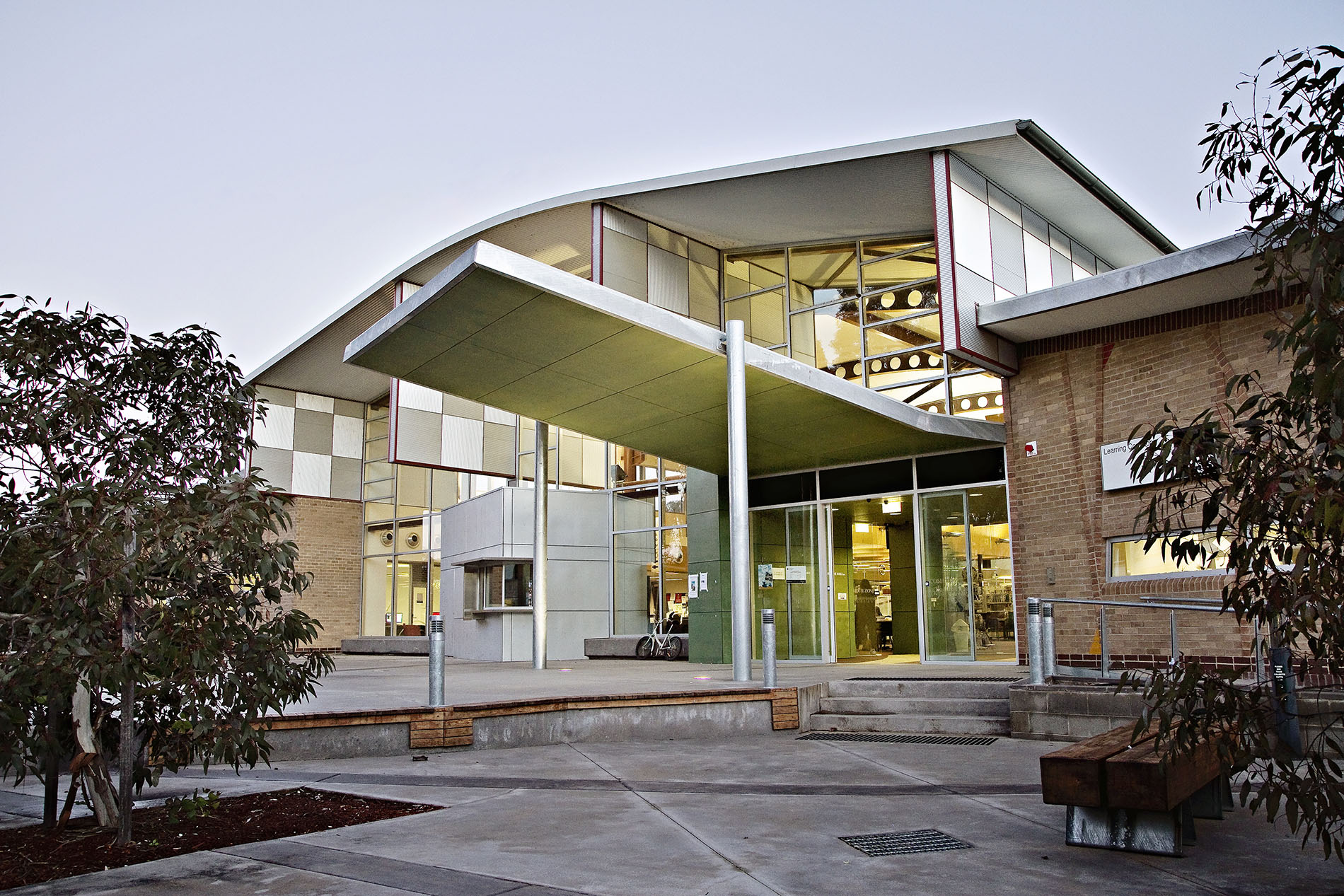
Charles Sturt University campus in Thurgoona

Thurgoona, to the east of Lavington, was established as a new residential suburb by the Albury Wodonga Development Corporation in the 1970s. In the 1990s a new campus of Charles Sturt University was established here, as was an office of the Murray Darling Freshwater Research Centre. A major golf club (Thurgoona Country Club Resort) is also situated in this suburb.

Further outlying localities include Splitters Creek – a small residential/farming community to the west, Ettamogah (home of the Ettamogah Pub), Bowna and Table Top to the north, and Wirlinga and Lake Hume village to the east. Howlong (20 km west) and Jindera (16 km north) are the closest towns outside the Albury city area, and act as commuter dormitories as well as service centres for the local rural industries.

Albury's houses and buildings are numbered using a special system introduced in 1920. The centre of the city, which is defined as the intersection of Dean and Olive Streets, is numbered 500, and all other houses are numbered depending on whether they are north, south, east or west of the centre.

=== Lake Hume ===
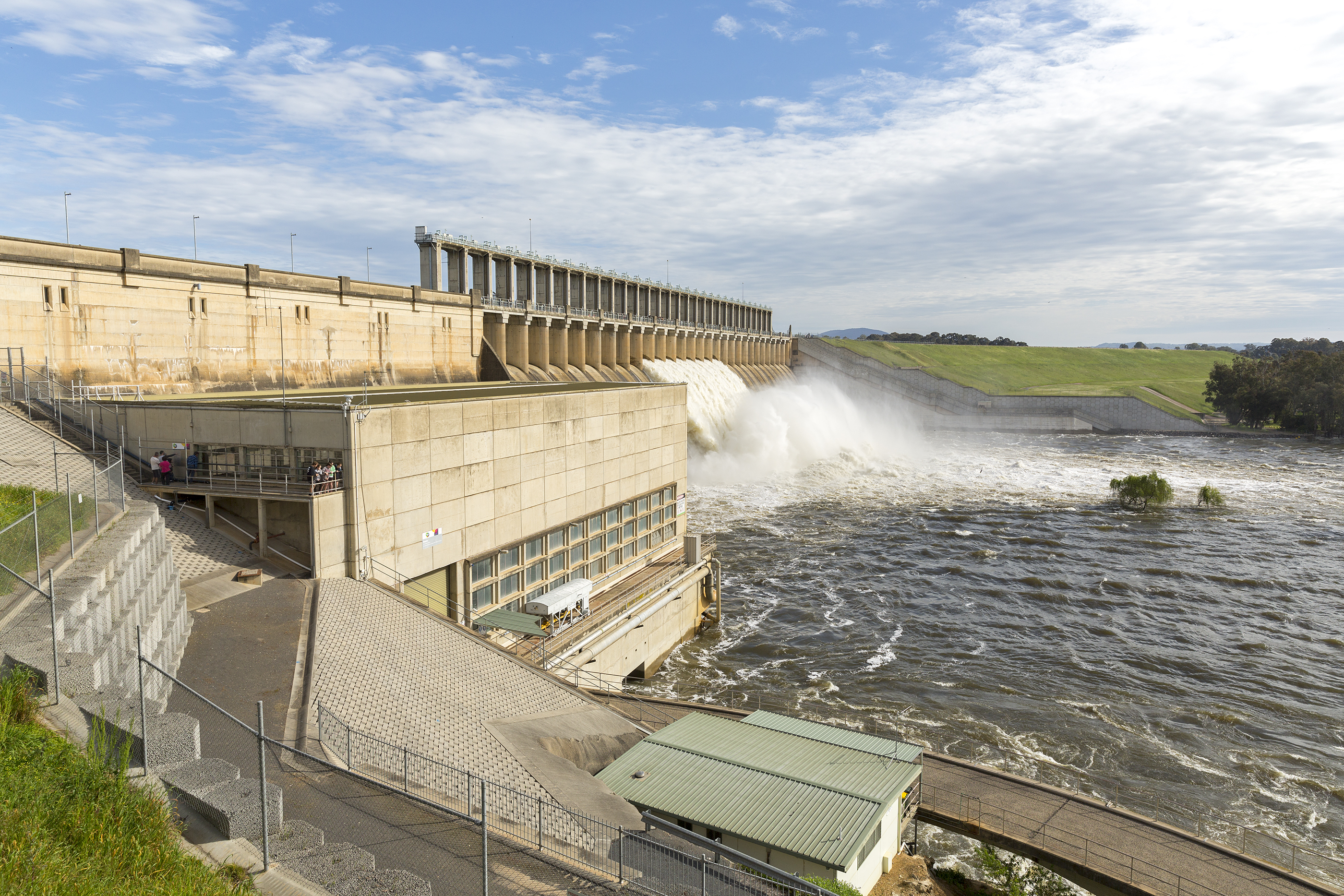
Hume Dam, with eight spillway gates open

Lake Hume is situated on the Murray River 10 kilometres (6.2 mi) upstream of Albury. The Hume Dam (colloquially termed the Weir locally) wall construction took 17 years, from 1919 to 1936. A hydro-electric power plant supplies 60 MW of power to the state grid. When full, the lake covers 80 square kilometres (31 sq mi).

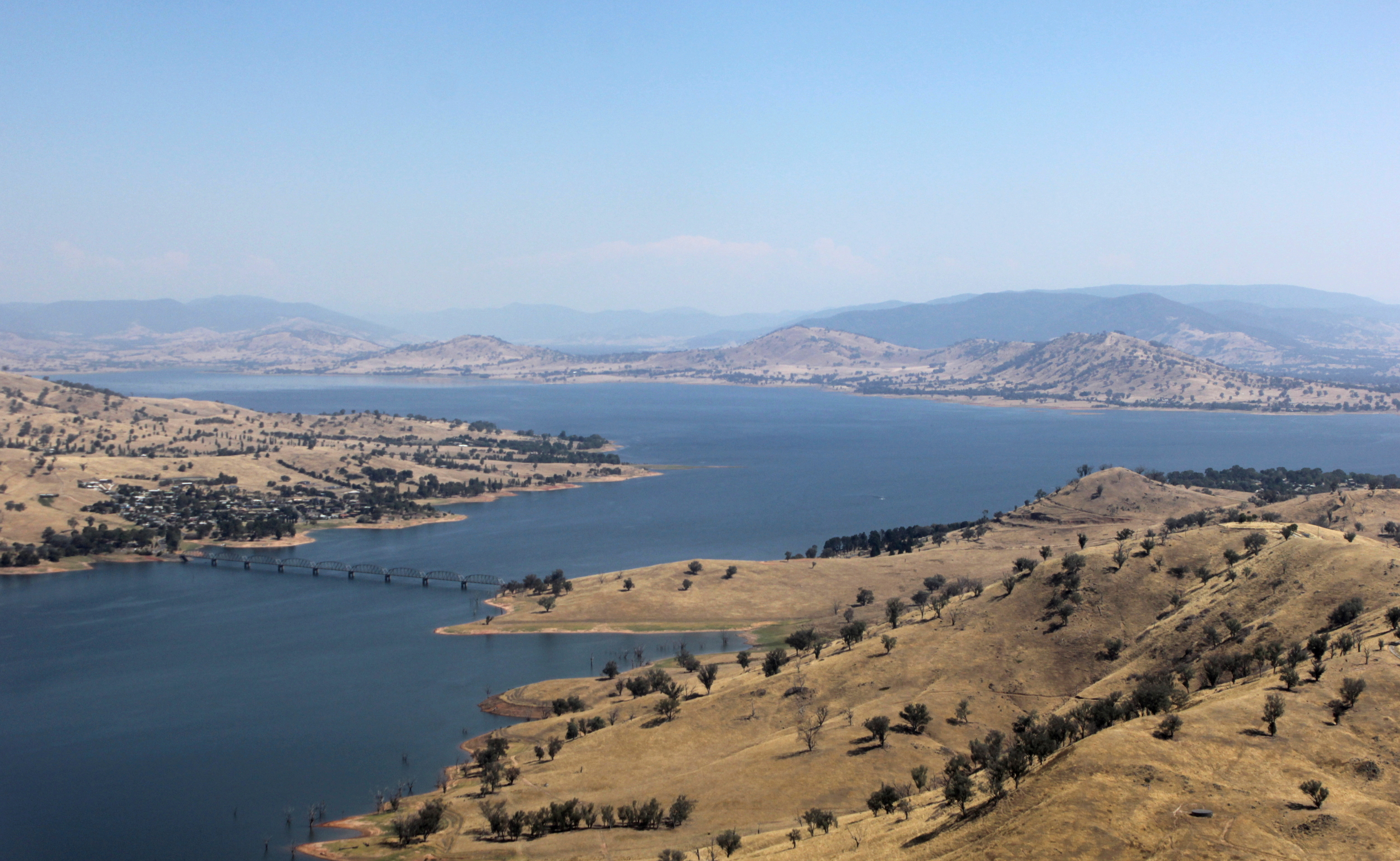
Lake Hume from the air in Summer

The lake was created for irrigation purposes and has caused significant changes to the flow patterns and ecology of the Murray River. Before the construction of the Hume Weir, flows in normal (non-drought) years were low in summer and autumn (though still significant overall), rising in winter due to seasonal rainfall and reaching a flood-peak in late spring due to snow-melt in the Murray and its tributaries' alpine headwaters. The flow is now effectively reversed, with low flows in winter and sustained, relatively high flows in late spring, summer and early autumn to meet irrigation demands, although the spring flood peak has been virtually eliminated. The water released from the base of the Hume Weir is unnaturally cold, at least 10 °C (18 °F) colder than it naturally should be. This flow reversal, temperature depression, and removal of the spring flood peak, has led to the drying out and loss of many billabongs and has harmed the populations of native fish of the Murray River such as the iconic Murray cod.

=== Flora and fauna ===
Several threatened species can be found in Albury, including the Sloane's froglet, regent honeyeater, and squirrel glider (Petaurus norfolcensis).

== Transport ==
=== Road ===
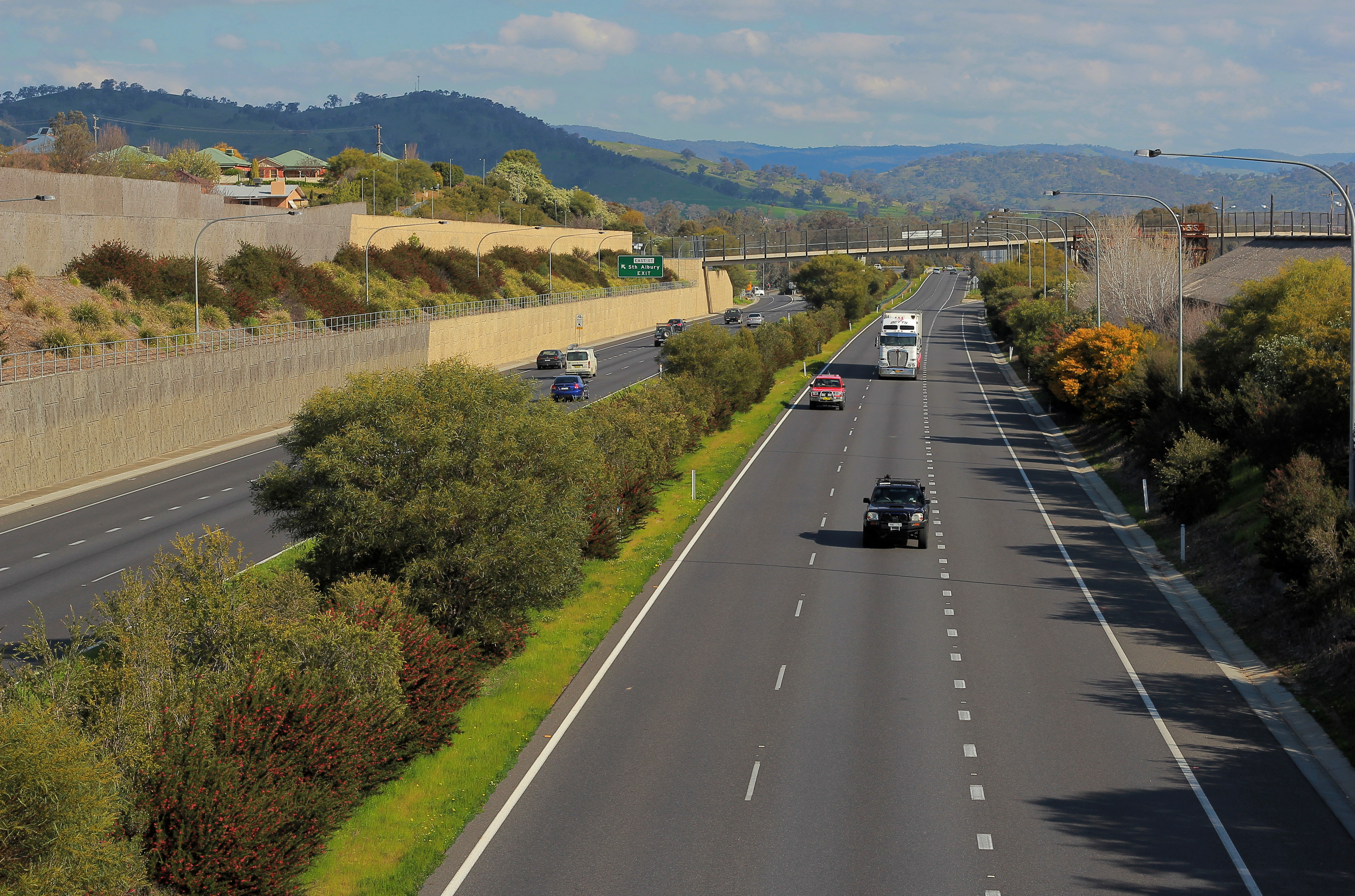
Hume Highway internal bypass running beside Albury railway station

Situated on the Hume Highway, Albury is a major transit point for interstate commerce. In March 2007, Albury city centre was bypassed by a new section of the Hume Freeway. The city centre bypass includes the new Spirit of Progress Bridge over the Murray River, and cost $518 million, the most expensive road project built in rural Australia at that time.

Creation of the lake resulting from construction of the Hume Dam from 1915 onward necessitated a 30 km deviation of the Hume Highway. The Highway originally ran east out of Albury, along what is now the Riverina Highway, then turned north through Thurgoona via today's Table Top Rd then Old Sydney Road, then crossed Bowna Creek to follow Plunkett Rd to Bowna. The deviation, opened in 1933, follows the first 9 km of the Wagga Road, then crossed the railway and ran to Bells Road before turning east then southeast to Bowna. Most of this route, although now duplicated, remains as part of the Hume Highway, other than the 2009 Yellow Creek deviation.

The other minor highways which connect to Albury are the Riverina Highway, which runs west through Berrigan to Deniliquin and east to Lake Hume; and the Olympic Highway which diverges north from the Hume 16 kilometres (9.9 mi) north of Albury, and runs across the South Western Slopes via Wagga Wagga, Cootamundra and Young to terminate at the Mid-Western Highway at Cowra.

In 1888, the Smollett Street wrought iron arch bridge was constructed over Bungambrawatha Creek. Smollet Street was extended westward through the botanical gardens to give direct access from Albury railway station to Howlong Road by a straight street. The bridge is near the botanic gardens and the local swimming pool. The bridge is a rare example of a metal arch bridge in New South Wales, and is the oldest of only two such bridges in New South Wales, the other being the Sydney Harbour Bridge.

=== Rail ===
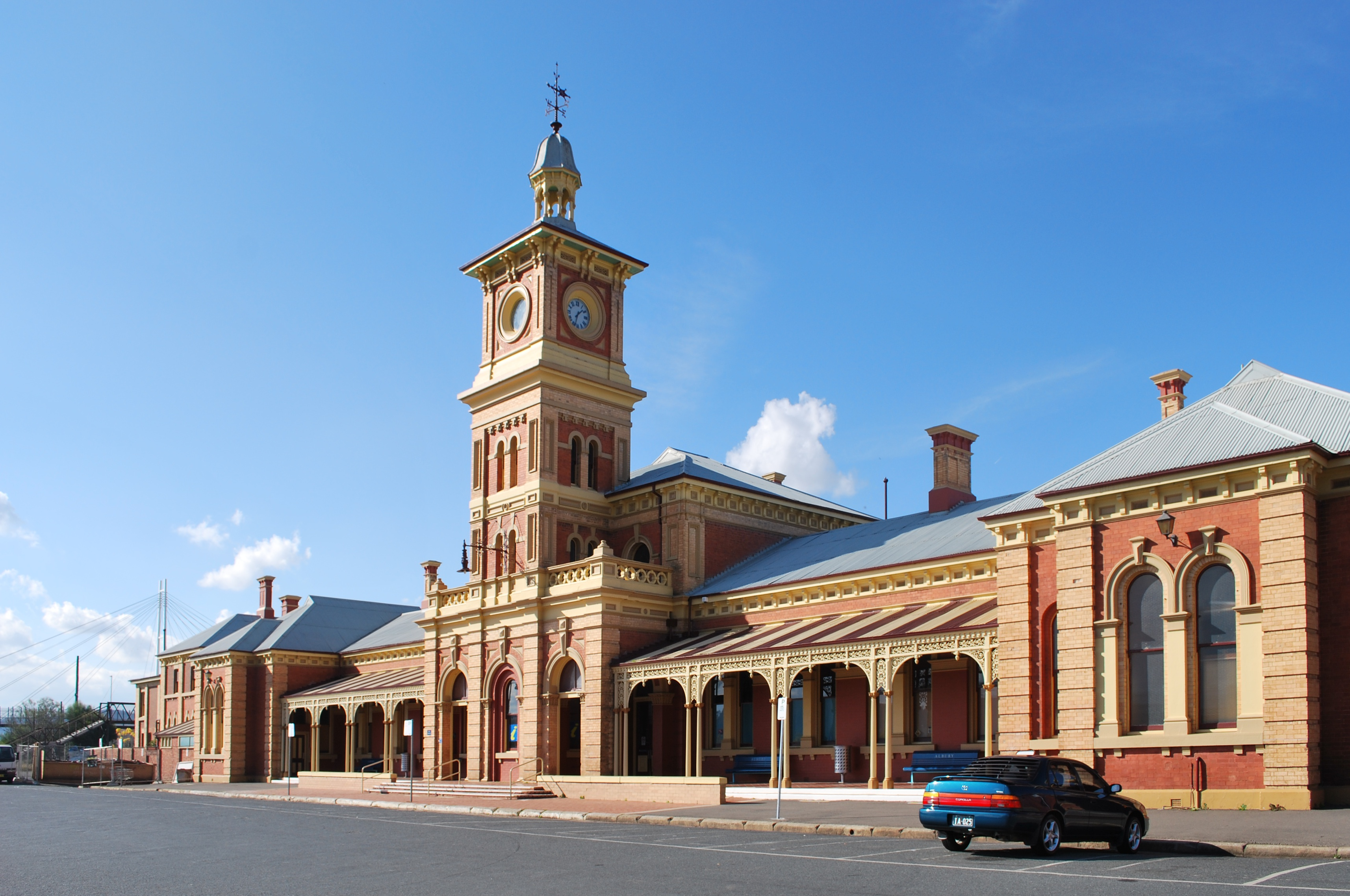
Albury railway station, built in 1881 in the Victorian Italianate style

Albury railway station is on the main Sydney-Melbourne railway line. Originally, New South Wales and Victoria had different track gauges, which meant that all travellers in either direction had to change trains at Albury. To accommodate this, a very long railway platform was needed; the 450-metre (1,480 ft) long covered platform is one of the longest in Australia. The broad gauge section of track between Seymour and Albury has now been converted to standard gauge; there is no longer a break-of-gauge at Albury station. The station is served by a three daily V/Line train services from Melbourne (terminating at Albury) and the NSW TrainLink Melbourne-Sydney XPT service, which runs twice daily in each direction. In 1873, the 5-foot-3-inch (1.60 m) broad gauge railway line from Melbourne reached the township of Belvoir/Wodonga. In 1881, the New South Wales 4-foot-8.5-inch (1.435 m) standard gauge railway line reached Albury, with a railway bridge joining the two colonies in 1883. Albury became the stop over, where passengers on the Melbourne-Sydney journey changed trains until 1962, when a standard gauge track was opened between the two capitals. After World War II, in an attempt to overcome the difference in gauges and speed up traffic, a bogie exchange device lifted freight wagons and carriages allowing workers to refit rolling stock with different gauged wheel-sets.

The break of railway gauge at Albury was a major impediment to Australia's war effort and infrastructure during both World Wars, as every soldier, every item of equipment, and all supplies had to be off-loaded from the broad gauge and reloaded onto a standard gauge railway wagon on the opposite side of the platform. In his book Tramps Abroad, writer Mark Twain in 1895 wrote of the break of gauge at Albury and changing trains: ""Now comes a singular thing, the oddest thing, the strangest thing, the most unaccountable marvel that Australia can show. At the frontier between NSW and Victoria our multitude of passengers were routed out of their snug beds by lantern light in the morning in the biting cold to change cars. Think of the paralysis of intellect that gave that idea birth, imagine the boulder it emerged from, on some petrified legislator's shoulders."

During World War II military armouries and warehouses were established in the vicinity of Albury at Bonegilla, Wirlinga and Bandiana. Similar stores were also established at Tocumwal and Oaklands. The conversion of the broad gauge track to a second standard gauge track, between Seymour and Albury, was substantially completed in 2011. The railway station and its associated yards are listed on both the Australian National Heritage List and the New South Wales State Heritage Register.

=== Air ===
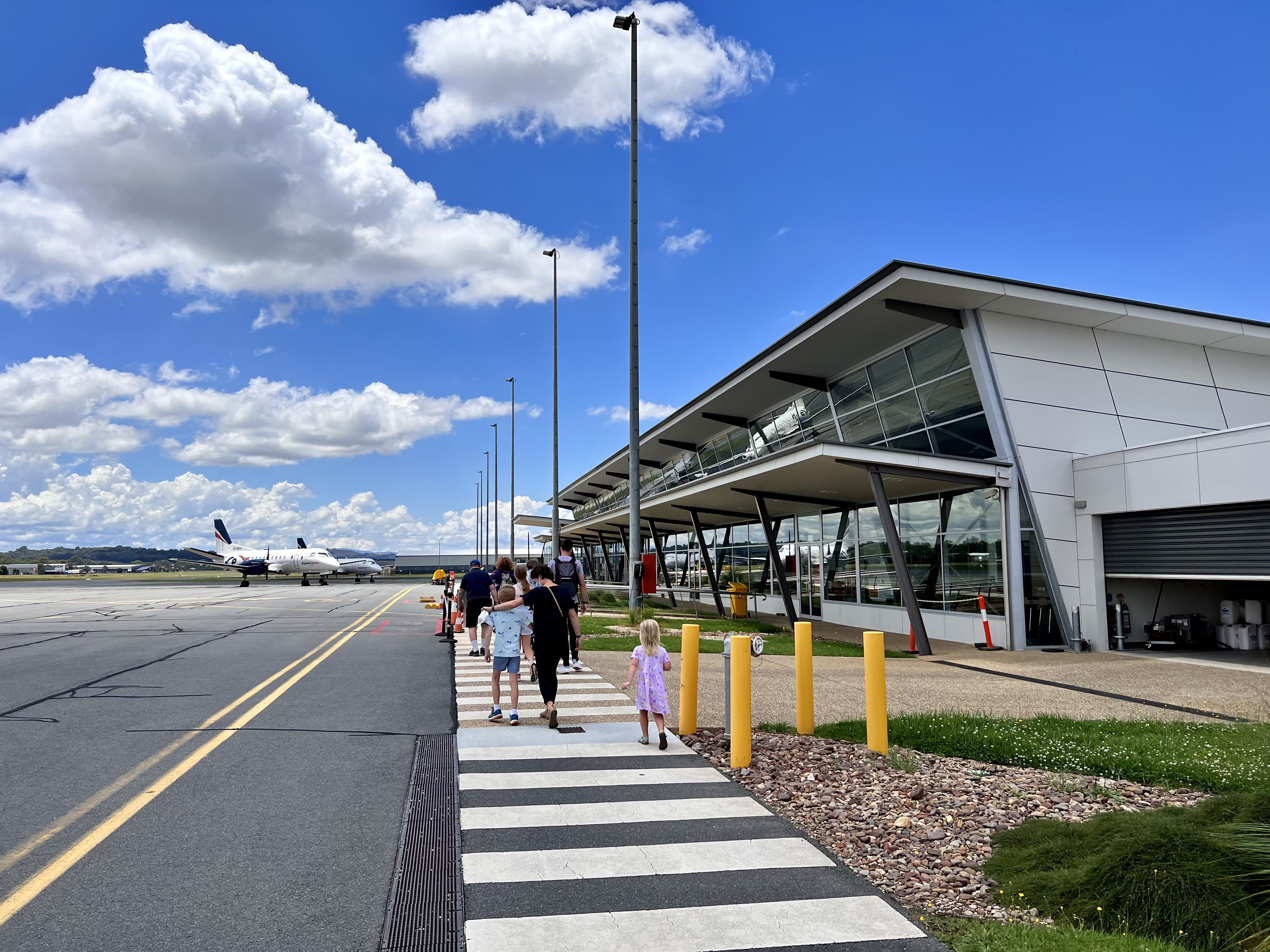
Albury Airport terminal

Albury Airport, owned and operated by the City of Albury, is the second busiest regional airport in New South Wales with around 280,000 passenger movements per year. The airport, 4 kilometres (2.5 mi) east of the city centre, has scheduled daily flights to Sydney, Melbourne and Brisbane through commercial carriers. The road leading from Albury Airport to the city was renamed Borella Road in 1979, in honour of Victoria Cross recipient Albert Chalmers Borella, who was buried at Albury.

=== Public transport and cycling ===
Local public transport is provided exclusively by private bus operators, Martin's Albury and Dysons who run day time bus services. The overwhelming majority of local transport is by private car, however traffic is generally moderate. The opening of the Hume Freeway bypass on 4 March 2007, has greatly eased previous traffic congestion on the Lincoln Causeway, allowing vastly better flow between Albury and Wodonga.

There is a good network of bicycle paths in the city, including one to the outlying suburb of Thurgoona and across the state border to Wodonga. A new program has built many more bike tracks, including one from the riverside parks to Wonga Wetlands.

== Industry ==
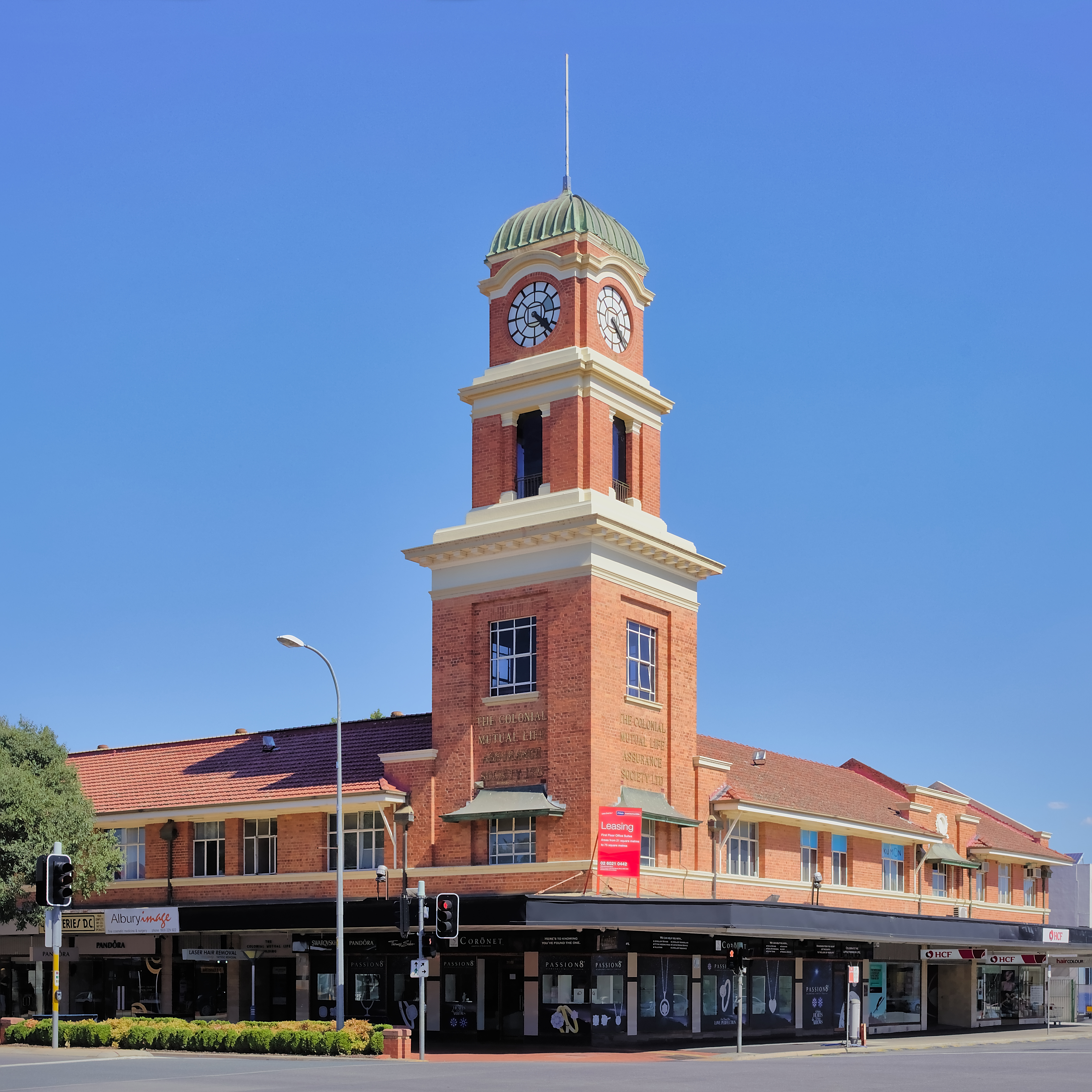
The former Colonial Mutual Life building

Albury serves as an administrative centre for the agricultural communities around the district and is a major processing centre of the Australian Taxation Office, and many other smaller secondary industries. Other large employers are: The Commercial Club Albury and Hume Bank. One of Albury's major employers was DSI Holdings. Originally the Kaitlers Road facility was opened as an expansion for Borg-Warner in 1971, manufacturing gearboxes for various manufacturers including Ford, Holden and even Maserati. At its peak in 1982 it employed 1251 people. The ownership of the plant changed several times – it was sold in 1987 to Nylex. It was sold again in 2002 to ION Ltd but the company collapsed in 2004 with debt to creditors of $550 million. Due to a failed deal with Holden the workforce was reduced to 750 people. Chinese car manufacturer Geely Group then purchased the bankrupt DSI company for $48 million in March 2009 and the plant then exported automatic transmissions to Geely, Ssangyong and Mahindra. In 2014 DSI Holdings closed the Lavington factory resulting in the loss of the remaining 142 jobs.

The Australian pizza chain Eagle Boys was founded in Albury but ceased operations in 2017 when it was purchased by Pizza Hut.

The Hume Power Station is a hydro-electric power station located at the Hume Dam on the Murray River, near Albury. The power station is operated by Eraring Energy and has two 29 MW turbines.

=== Tourism ===
The region surrounding Albury provides a variety of tourist attractions, including the wine region centred on Rutherglen, the historic goldfield towns of Beechworth and Yackandandah, boating, fishing and canoe hire on the many rivers and lakes, including Lake Hume, the forests and mountains of the Great Dividing Range and slightly further afield the snowfields Falls Creek and Mount Hotham.

Within the city of Albury itself, Monument Hill, at the western end of the CBD is the location of the city's distinctive First World War Memorial and provides a good view of the city. Wonga Wetlands, 2.5 kilometres (1.6 mi) west of the city and adjacent to the River Murray is a key feature of Albury's use of treated wastewater and consists of a series of lagoons and billabongs. Wonga Wetlands boasts more than 150 species of birdlife and is home to the Aquatic Environment Education Centre.

The Hume and Hovell Walking Track, that begins in Yass and follows the route of explorers Hamilton Hume and William Hovell on their 1824 expedition to Port Phillip, ends at the Hovell Tree in South Albury.

=== Education ===
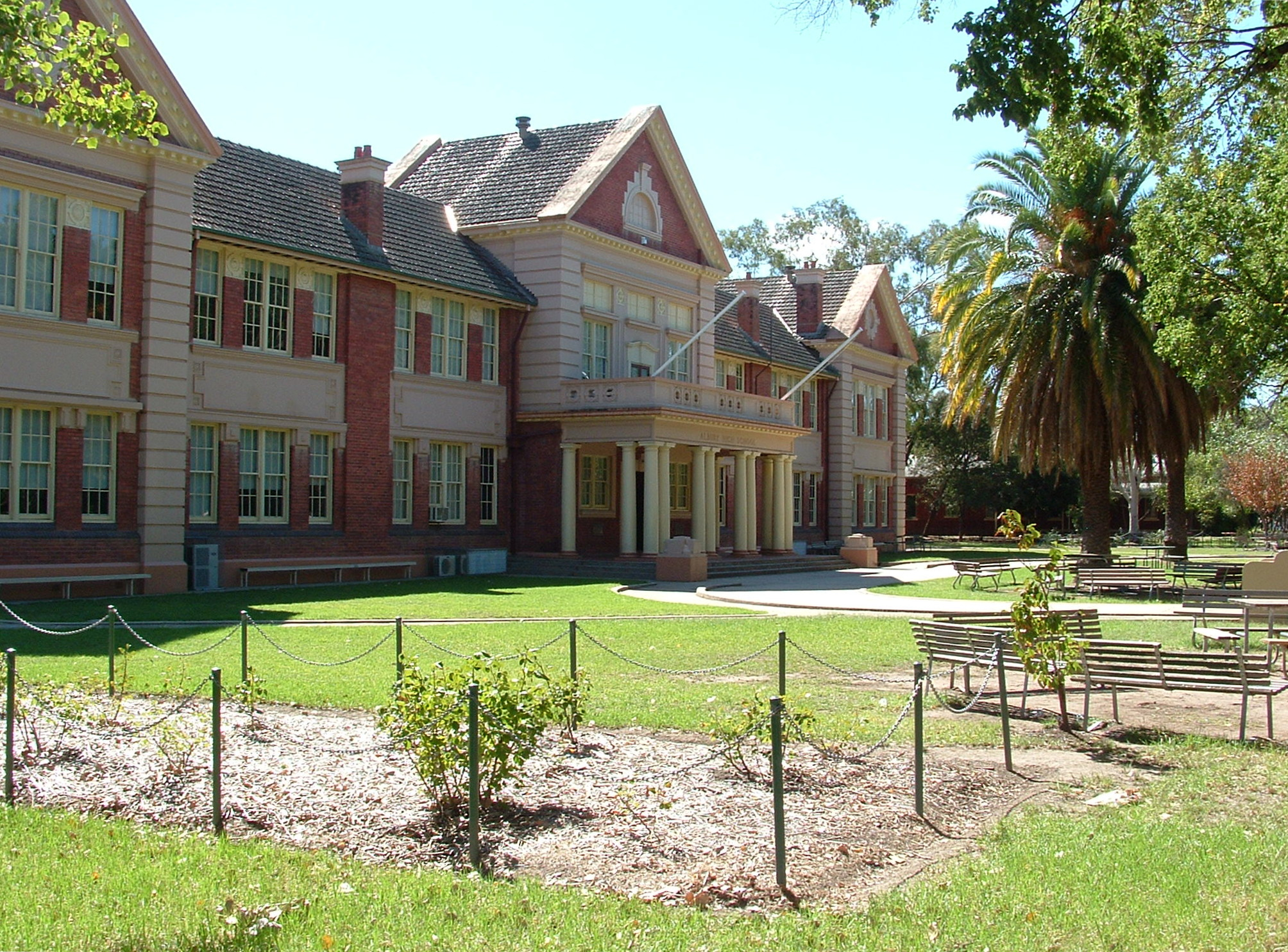
Albury High School

Albury is home to one of the campuses of Charles Sturt University. The original Albury campus was located in the northern part of the CBD between Kiewa and David streets. Charles Sturt University relocated to a new purpose-built campus at Thurgoona in 2009. CSU offers courses in Arts, Business, Education, Medicine and Science.

The Albury-Wodonga campus of La Trobe University is also a large and growing educational institution with several thousand undergraduates and postgraduates in its two colleges. Degrees in Business, Arts, Science, Bioscience, Nursing, and various Allied Health disciplines, are available.

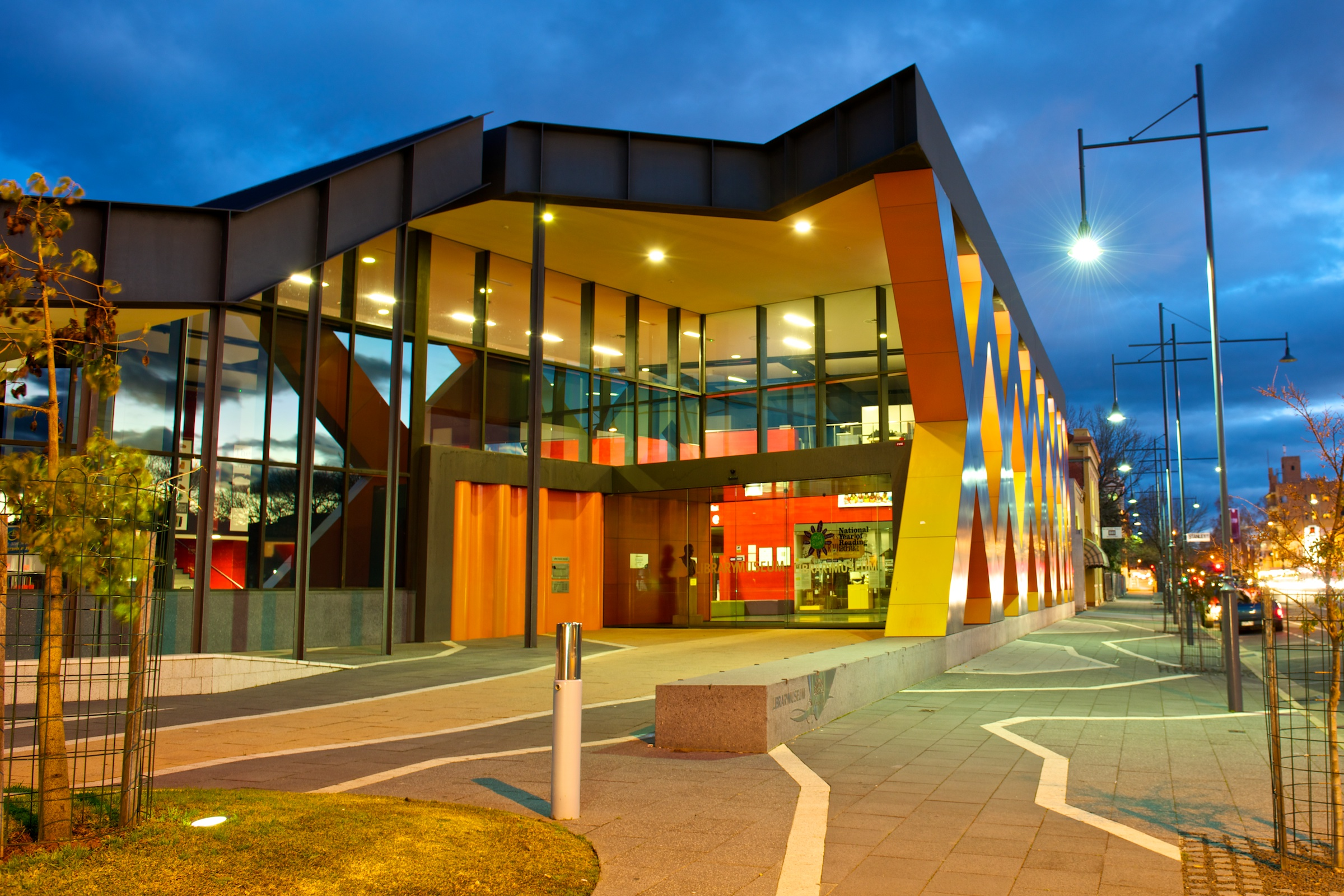
Albury Library Museum

Riverina Institute of TAFE operates a campus in Albury. There is also a campus of the UNSW Rural Clinical School of Medicine adjacent to the Albury Base Hospital.

Albury is home to nine public primary schools (Albury Public School, Albury North Public School, Albury West Public School, Glenroy Public School, Hume Public School, Lavington Public School, Lavington East Public School, Springdale Heights Public School, and Thurgoona Public School) and three public high schools (Albury High School, James Fallon High School and Murray High School). Several non-government high schools operate in the area including Trinity Anglican College, Xavier High School, The Scots School Albury, Border Christian College, Aspect Riverina school, and St Paul's College. The city is the base for NSW Department of Education South West Riverina regional office.

== Culture ==
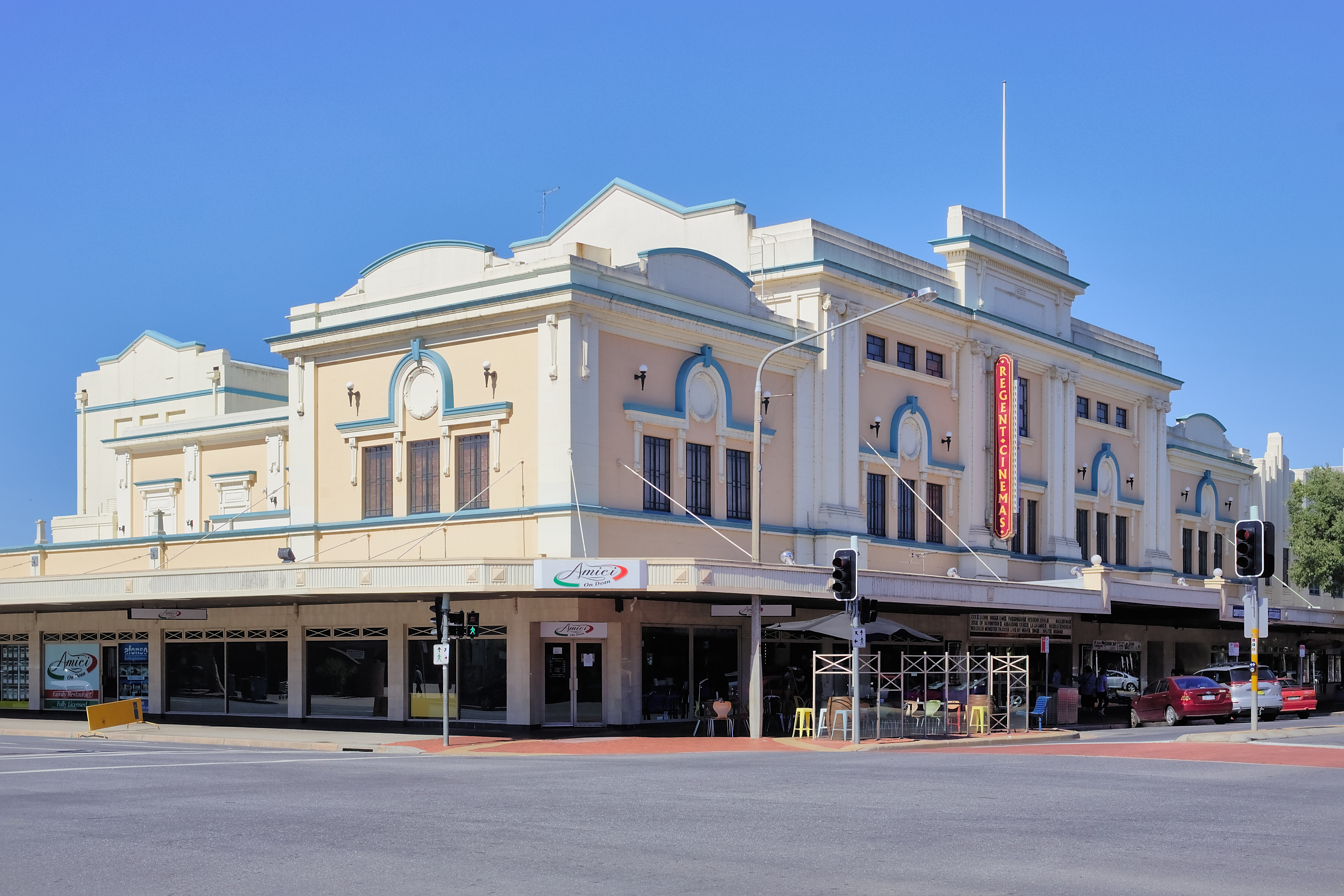
Regent Cinemas on Dean Street have operated since 1929

HotHouse Theatre is Albury's only professional theatre company, previously known as the Murray River Performance Group which formed in 1979. It spawned The Flying Fruit Fly Circus in 1979, and these days conducts many productions through the HotHouse Theatre located on Gateway Island between Albury and Wodonga, though still in Victoria rather than New South Wales.

Albury is home to a large number of amateur theatre companies presenting productions ranging from plays in intimate settings to major musicals in the Albury Entertainment Centre and Shakespeare and other events in the Albury Botanic Gardens. The oldest theatre company in Albury is the Albury Wodonga Theatre Company and its associated youth theatre company BYTESized Productions often presenting shows in its small theatre in Olive St, South Albury . Other companies and organisations producing theatre in Albury Wodonga are Livid Productions, The Other Theatre Company, Revolution Theatre, and Centre Stage Event Company.

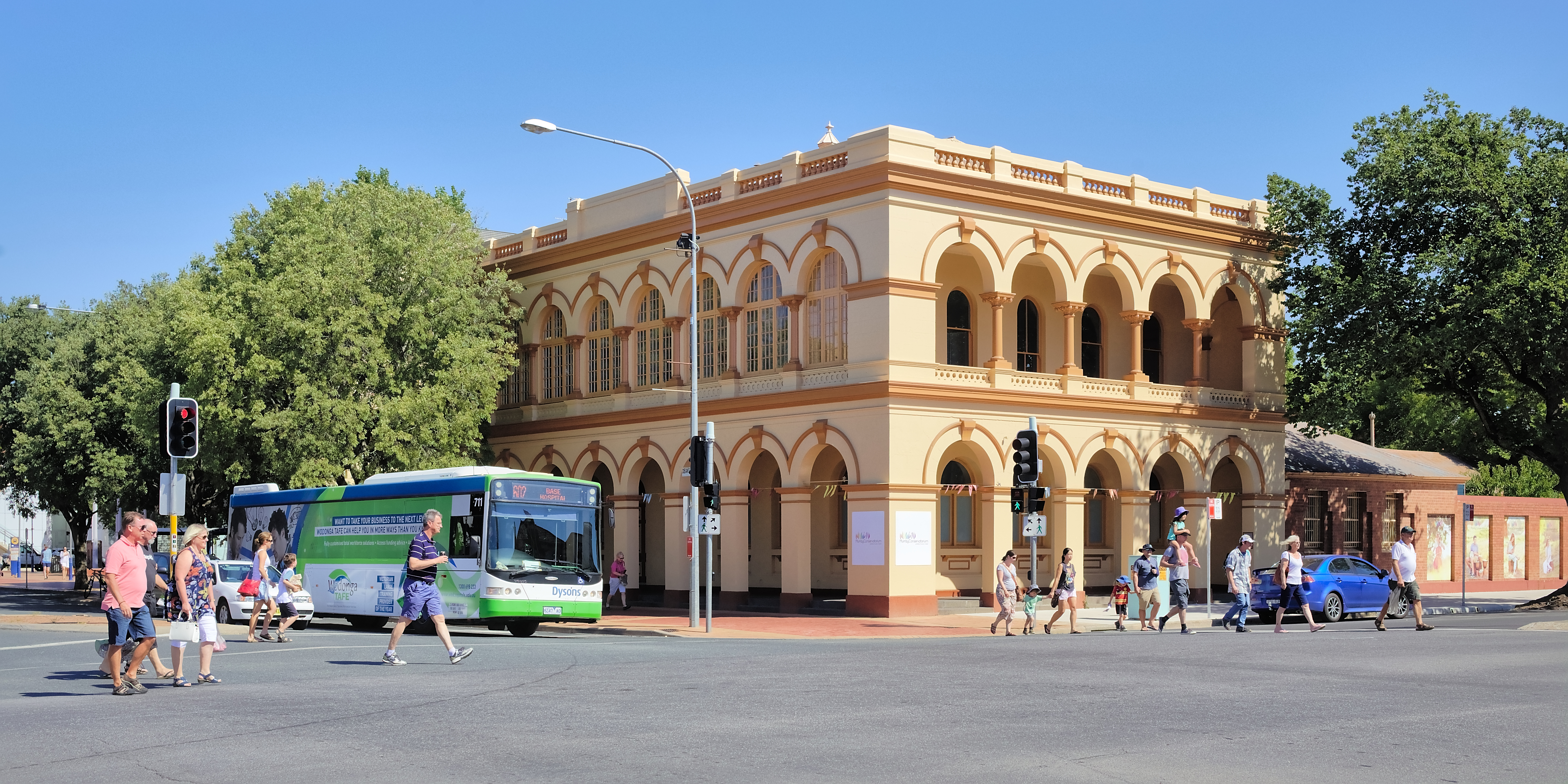
The Murray Conservatorium of Music

Jazz Albury Wodonga also regularly hosts national and international artists at the Jazz Basement which is located on Gateway Island.

The 1993 film Lex and Rory was filmed in Albury-Wodonga.

Touring productions and major music acts often perform at the Albury Entertainment Centre. Regent Cinemas on Dean Street have operated since 1929.

Since 2007, the city has hosted the annual Albury City Short Story Award, curated by the Write Around the Murray Writers' Festival.

In 2015 Murray Art Museum Albury (MAMA) was opened, formerly known as Albury Regional Arts Centre. The art museum has 10 galleries with double the space of the former art centre. Canvas Eatery is also attached to MAMA, facing onto Queen Elizabeth II Square.

In 2003, a sister city relationship with Nanping in north western Fujian province, China, was formalised.

== Media ==
=== Print ===
Albury serves as a regional media centre. A daily tabloid owned by Nine Entertainment, The Border Mail, is printed in, and has offices in, Wodonga.

There was a free monthly independent community newspaper, The Situation, which launched in Albury–Wodonga in 2013. Later it expanded into other Victorian communities in the north and north-east such as Benalla, Echuca–Moama, Seymour, Shepparton and Wangaratta. It shut down in 2019.

=== Television ===
Albury has access to all major TV networks, with channels available including Seven Network, WIN Television (an affiliate of the Nine Network), Network 10, as well as the Australian Broadcasting Corporation (ABC) and the Special Broadcasting Service, more commonly known as SBS.

Of the three main commercial networks, Seven Network airs a half-hour local news bulletin at 6 pm each weeknight, produced from a newsroom in the city but broadcast from studios in Canberra.

Network 10 (formerly Southern Cross 10) airs short local news updates from its Hobart studios throughout the day (on weekdays). The flagship bulletin aired on Network 10 in Albury/Wodonga is 10 News from Melbourne.

WIN Television broadcasts a half-hour state-wide regional WIN News bulletin each weeknight at 5:30 pm, produced from studios in Wollongong. Previously a local edition was produced by WIN until the closure of its Albury newsroom in June 2019.

On 5 May 2011, analogue television transmissions ceased in most areas of regional Victoria and some border regions including Albury–Wodonga. All local free-to-air television services are now broadcasting in digital transmission only. This was done as part of the Federal Government's plan for Digital terrestrial television in Australia where all analogue transmission systems are gradually turned off and replaced with modern DVB-T transmission systems.

=== Radio ===
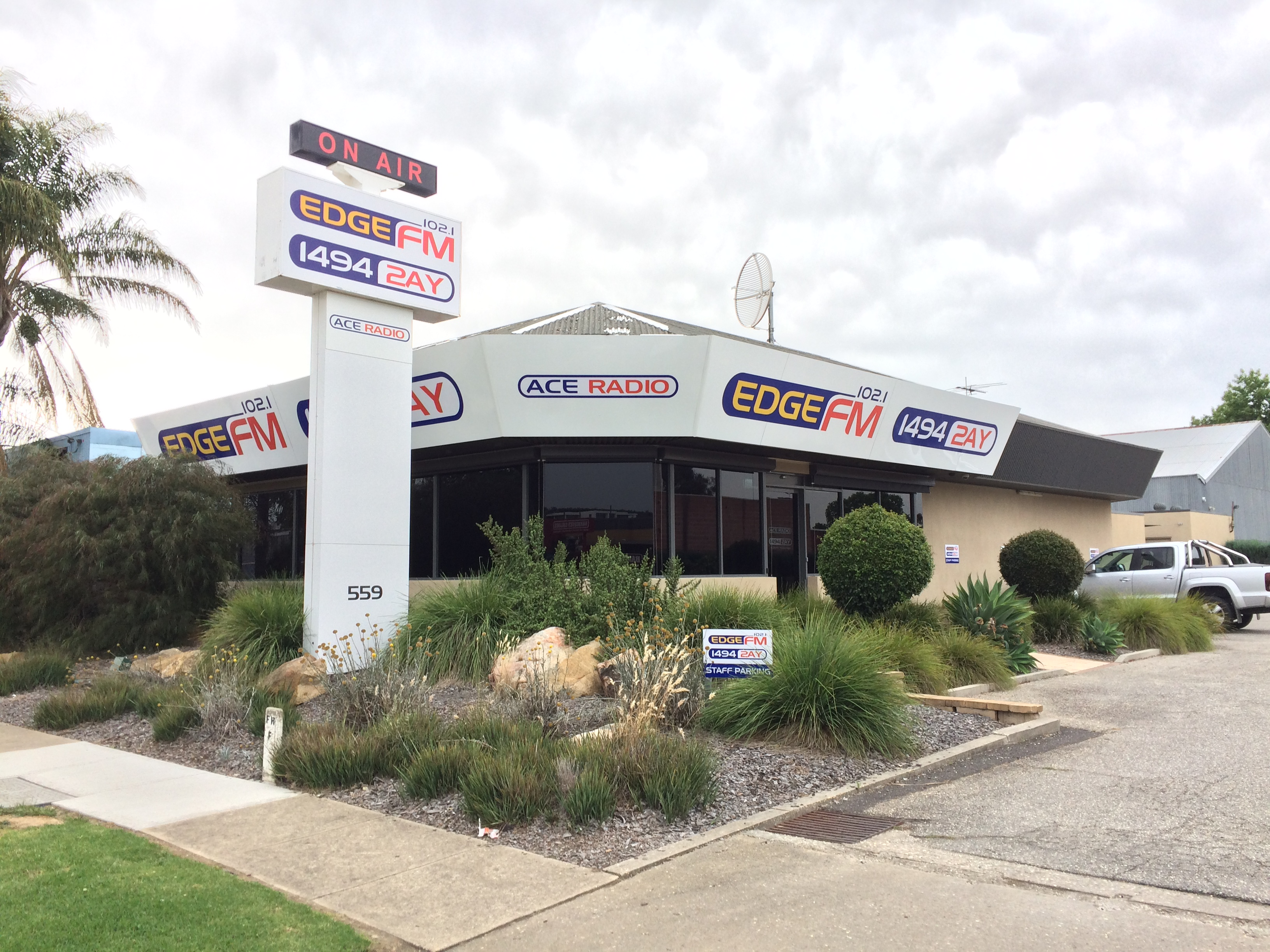
The 2AY and Edge FM studios

There are three commercial radio stations in Albury – 2AY on 1494 AM, Triple M The Border on 105.7 FM and Hit The Border on 104.9 FM. Hit 104.9 The Border's south eastern network is programmed out of the Albury/Wodonga Hub, going to centres in the Australian Capital Territory, New South Wales, Victoria, Tasmania and South Australia. Broadcasting out of the same building is Triple M 105.7 The Border, which is also networked to local stations around the Australian Capital Territory, New South Wales, Victoria, Tasmania and South Australia.

Albury/Wodonga is one radio market, thus advertisements are directed to both sides of the border. The Albury/Wodonga market underwent significant change in 2005 when Macquarie Southern Cross Media bought 105.7 The River from RG Capital, and 2AY and Star FM from DMG Radio Australia. Due to cross-media ownership laws preventing the ownership of more than two stations in one market, Macquarie was required to sell one of these stations and in September 2005 sold 2AY to the Ace Radio network. 2AY takes much of its daytime and evening programming from 3AW in Melbourne. The ABC produces breakfast and morning radio programs through its local radio network, from the studios of ABC Goulburn Murray, 106.5 FM, located in Wodonga. Most of the rest its programming content is delivered from Melbourne. The ABC also has local transmitters for Radio National, 990 AM; ABC News Radio, 100.9 FM; ABC Classic, 104.1 FM and Triple J, 103.3 FM

There is also a community radio station known as 2REM 107.3 FM. The Albury Wodonga Community Radio station broadcasts a large number of speciality programs including those for the retiree, racing enthusiast, ethnic and Aboriginal communities and a range of musical styles including underground and independent artists from 8:00 pm onwards. 2GHR 96.7 FM is another community radio station that plays classic hits. Oak 101.3 FM (from Wangaratta) can be heard clearly across the region. KIX 801 AM (on the narrowcast band) plays country music. Sky Radio is a sports and racing station which can be heard on 99.3 FM

In addition, the area is serviced by SBS Radio and Niche Radio, which provide national multicutural stations. SBS Radio 1 is available on 1701 AM, SBS Radio 2 is available on 89.5 FM, while Niche Radio broadcasts on 87.6 FM. 2APH 101.7 FM is a reading for the print handicapped station. TAFE FM is Wodonga's broadcasting and training station on 88.4 that also serves the area. Albury-Wodonga Christian Broadcasters transmits as 98.5 The Light. Other religious stations include Faith FM which broadcasts on 88.0 and Vision Christian Radio that airs on 1611 AM. The dance music station Raw FM airs on 107.9

== Sport ==
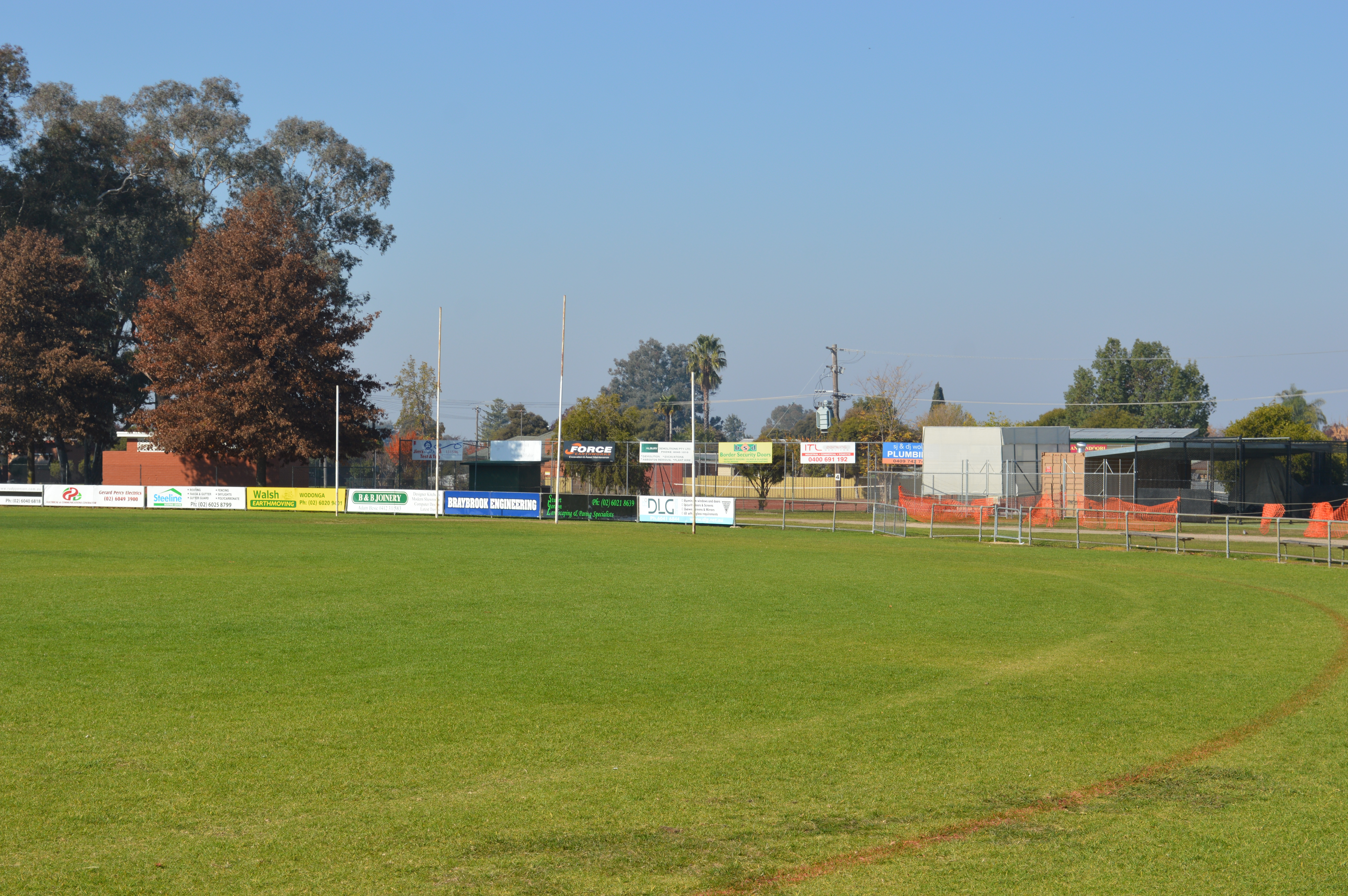
Urana Road Oval, Lavington

Football is a very popular code with more than 2,500 players registered from twelve local clubs (six from Albury) competing in the Albury Wodonga Football Association. Clubs have teams from U10s through to Senior Men and Women and play on Sundays with MiniRoos providing Football for ages 4–12 on Saturdays. Since 2016, Murray United Football Club, a team encompassing Albury, Wodonga and the wider region, has been competing in the National Premier Leagues Victoria, the highest level of Football in the area. On 9 February 2014, Melbourne City (then known as Melbourne Heart) triumphed 2–1 against Perth Glory in scorching conditions, where the temperature got as high as 41 °C, at the Lavington Sports Ground.

The Albury-Wodonga Steamers are the local rugby union club, playing in the Southern Inland Rugby Union competition. The Steamers have produced several players for the Australian Rugby Union National Talent Squad.

Cricket is the most popular summer sport in the region, with the local Cricket Albury Wodonga competition administered by Country Cricket New South Wales. In the 1992 Cricket World Cup, the Lavington Sports Ground hosted Albury's only international cricket match. It was a One Day International in which Zimbabwe defeated England in the biggest upset of the tournament. Albury also regularly hosts Big Bash League matches in both the pre-season and regular season, often involving the Sydney Thunder and Melbourne Stars.

Albury has a strong rugby league community, with three senior teams based in the city, the Albury Thunder, Border Bears and CSU Mud Dogs. The Thunder compete in the strong, Riverina-based Group 9 Rugby League competition, while the Bears and Mud Dogs compete in the Goulburn Murray Rugby League run under the banner of the Victorian Rugby League. Albury Thunder Juniors is one of the largest junior rugby league clubs outside of metropolitan areas, offering rugby league and league tag to the Border's young men and women from 5 years to 16 years. Albury has produced many great rugby league players, with the two most famous exports being former Canberra and Penrith flyer Adrian Purtell and Australian fullback Dylan Edwards.

Despite being located in New South Wales, Albury is a stronghold of Australian rules. There are five Australian rules clubs in Albury, the Albury Football Club, the Lavington Panthers Football Club, the Murray Magpies Football Club, the North Albury Football Club, and the Thurgoona Football Club. Albury, Lavington Panthers and North Albury compete in the Ovens & Murray Football League (OMFNL), while the Murray Magpies compete in the Hume Football League and Thurgoona compete in the Tallangatta & District Football League. The OMFNL is one of the strongest regional leagues in the nation, with the Grand Final regularly drawing 15,000 spectators. Many players from Albury have moved on to play in the Australian Football League, including Haydn Bunton Senior, who won three Brownlow Medals and was an inaugural legend of the Australian Football Hall of Fame; Fitzroy 1936 Brownlow medallist Denis "Dinny" Ryan; and South Melbourne Brownlow medallist Fred Goldsmith.

The Albury Gold Cup horse race is the major autumn event for the district. In 2005, it attracted a record crowd in excess of 18,600 racegoers.

Albury has lately become a stronghold of junior hockey, boasting one of the few synthetic fields in the area. The town also has the Albury Grass Tennis Courts. Supercars Championship team Brad Jones Racing is based in Albury, making it the only team in the championship to have its workshop in New South Wales.

The Albury Wodonga Bandits compete in the South East Australian Basketball League (SEABL) East Conference of the Australian Basketball Association (ABA), playing their home games at the Lauren Jackson Sports Centre (previously known as the Albury Sports Stadium). The Lady Bandits joined the women's SEABL in 2006.

Albury is the birthplace of former tennis player Margaret Court, winner of 62 Women's Grand Slam titles including eleven Australian titles, four Grand Slam singles titles played in one year (1970), four mixed doubles titles with Ken Fletcher in 1963 and many other titles around the world. WNBA MVP winner Lauren Jackson, NRL Player Adrian Purtell, and test cricketer Steve Rixon are among other champion sports people from the area.

== Notable crime ==
Albury's most notorious crime is also one of Australia's most famous, the 'Pyjama Girl Murder' in 1934. Other notable crimes include the murders of Bronwynne Richardson who was abducted on Smollett Street on 12 October 1973. Her body was found in Horseshoe Lagoon two days later. The case has never been solved despite a coronial inquest in 2011 which resulted in an arrest. In another case, on 23 March 1996, Kim Meredith was murdered in Macauley Street while walking from Sodens Hotel to the Termo Hotel. A memorial to Kim was later placed in Queen Elizabeth II Square by the citizens of Albury.

== Heritage listings ==
The following buildings, structures, and ephemera in Albury are listed in various heritage registers:

Building name	Completed	Heritage register(s)	Notes
ANZ Bank (former)	c. 1907	(now defunct) Register of the National Estate (RNE)	Designed by G C Inskip; built by Frew & Logan
Bellevue Home	c. 1860	(now defunct) RNE	
Bethanga Bridge	1927–30	New South Wales State Heritage Register; Victorian Heritage Register	
Bonegilla House (Grace-evelyn Lodge)	mid-Victorian	New South Wales State Heritage Register	587 Kiewa Street
Burrows House	c. 1860	(now defunct) RNE	
The Carriageway	c. 1860	New South Wales State Heritage Register	506–508 Smollet Street
CML Building	c. 1925	(now defunct) RNE	
Commercial Hotel and Cottage (formerly Waterstreet Hotel)	c. 1854	New South Wales State Heritage Register	430–436 Smollett Street
Court House	1860	(now defunct) RNE	Designed by Alexander Dawson
Elm Court	c. 1885	New South Wales State Heritage Register	435 Townsend Street
Headmaster's Cottage	c. 1861	(now defunct) RNE	Kiewa Street
Model Store	Federation	New South Wales State Heritage Register	582 David Street
New Albury Hotel	1939	New South Wales State Heritage Register	491 Kiewa Street
Post Office	c. 1880	New South Wales State Heritage Register; (now defunct) RNE	570 Dean Street; Designed by James Barnet
Public School	c. 1881	(now defunct) RNE	Designed by W. E. Kemp
Albury railway station, Stationmaster's Residence, and associated yards	1881	Australian National Heritage List; New South Wales State Heritage Register; (now defunct) RNE	
Albury-Wodonga Railway Bridge	1883–84	New South Wales State Heritage Register	Designed by John Whitton
Reid's Butcher Shop	unknown	New South Wales State Heritage Register	462 Guinea Street
S M Abichair Haberdashery Store	c. 1917	(now defunct) RNE	
Soden's Hotel Australia	c. 1855	(now defunct) RNE	
T&G Building	c. 1935	(now defunct) RNE	Border Mail 31 January 1939 buildings purchased by anonymous, possibly T & G.
Technical College (formerly Telegraph Office)	c. 1885	New South Wales State Heritage Register; (now defunct) RNE	502 Dean Street
Town Hall	c. 1907	(now defunct) RNE	
Turk's Head Museum (formerly Turk's Head Hotel)	c. 1860–70	(now defunct) RNE	
Uiver Collection	1934	New South Wales State Heritage Register	553 Kiewa Street; a collection of ephemera relating to the flight of the Uiver in the MacRobertson International Centenary Air Race of 1934

== Notable people ==
- Jim Armstrong (wrestler and rugby league player)
- Damien Brown (mixed martial artist)
- Haydn Bunton Sr., Australian Football Hall of Fame Legend
- William Carter (actor)
- Margaret Court (tennis player)
- Daniel Cross (Australian rules footballer)
- W.A. Crowle (businessman and philanthropist)
- Ben Doolan (Australian rules footballer)
- Dylan Edwards (rugby league player)
- Alexander England (actor)
- Carly Findlay (writer and activist)
- Eric Frauenfelder (rugby league player)
- Dianne Fromholtz (tennis player)
- Reg Gleeson (Australian rules footballer)
- Dick Grimmond (Australian rules footballer)
- Ross Henshaw (Australian rules footballer)
- Zarlie Goldsworthy (Australian rules footballer)
- Lisa Ho (fashion designer)
- Matt Holmes (actor)
- Noel Hodda (actor)
- Lauren Jackson (basketball player)
- Hayley Jensen (singer)
- Brad Jones (racing driver)
- Lee Kernaghan (singer and 2008 Australian of the Year)
- Tania Kernaghan (singer)
- Brett Kirk (Australian rules footballer)
- Maggie Kirkpatrick (actress)
- Jacob Koschitzke (Australian rules footballer)
- Justin Koschitzke (Australian rules footballer)
- Brian Leahy, Australian rules footballer
- Lee'Mon (singer)
- Darren Mapp (rugby league player)
- Ken Maynard (cartoonist of Ettamogah Pub)
- Malcolm McEachern (singer)
- Anthony Miles (Australian rules footballer)
- Lisa Mitchell (singer)
- Adam Nable (rugby league player)
- Matt Nable (rugby league player)
- Ellie Pashley (runner)
- Gab Pound (Australian rules footballer)
- Adrian Purtell (rugby league player)
- David Reynolds (racing driver)
- Richard Roxburgh (actor)
- Bill Ryan (rugby league player)
- Mat Ryan (rugby league player)
- Dr 'Paddy' Ryan (priest)
- Will Setterfield (Australian rules footballer)
- Charlie Spargo (Australian rules footballer)
- Geoff Strang (Australian rules footballer)
- Paul Spargo (Australian rules footballer)
- Clementine Stoney (Olympic swimmer)
- Terry Underwood (author)
- Charles Waterstreet (barrister and author)
- Bill Wood (Australian rules footballer)

== See also ==
- Christmas Eye, a seasonal epidemic of corneal ulceration which predominantly occurs only within a particular region of Australia
- Albury City Short Story Competition
- Albury Wodonga Football Association

== Further reading and viewing ==
- Fischer, Tim (2005). "Forward". In Marsh, Bill 'Swampy' (ed.). Great Australian Railway Stories. ABC Books.
- Journey of a Nation (DVD). Film Australia. 1947.
- Just Australian Trains (DVD). Australian Broadcasting Corporation. 1986.
