= Eric Frauenfelder =

Australian rugby league player

Personal information
- Born: 23 May 1901; Melbourne, VIC, Australia
- Died: 11 August 1993 (aged 92); Brisbane, QLD, Australia

Playing information
- Position: Fullback
Representative
Years	Team	Pld	T	G	FG	P
1921–25	Queensland	25	5	0	0	15
1924	Australia	3	0	0	0	0

Eric Frauenfelder (23 May 1901 – 11 August 1993) was an Australian rugby league player.

Raised in Albury, Frauenfelder was the descent of German migrants and attended the local Christian Brother's College, then relocated to the Queensland town of Ipswich after finishing school.

Frauenfelder was a Queensland Country representative cricketer, won a state lightweight boxing championship and also competed in Australian rules football, from which he gained some of the skills needed to play fullback when he switched to rugby league in 1921. He played fullback in the 1920s Queensland sides which dominated New South Wales in interstate matches and represented Australia in three home Test matches against Great Britain in 1924.
