= Albury City Short Story Award =

Australian literary award

The Albury City Short Story Award (ACSSA) is an annual Australian literary award, established in 2007 in the Australian regional city of Albury and curated by the Write Around the Murray Writers' Festival. The award is widely recognised in Australian literature, and a special children's writing competition, the Barry Young River of Stories, is also curated by the Festival.
