= Bonegilla House =

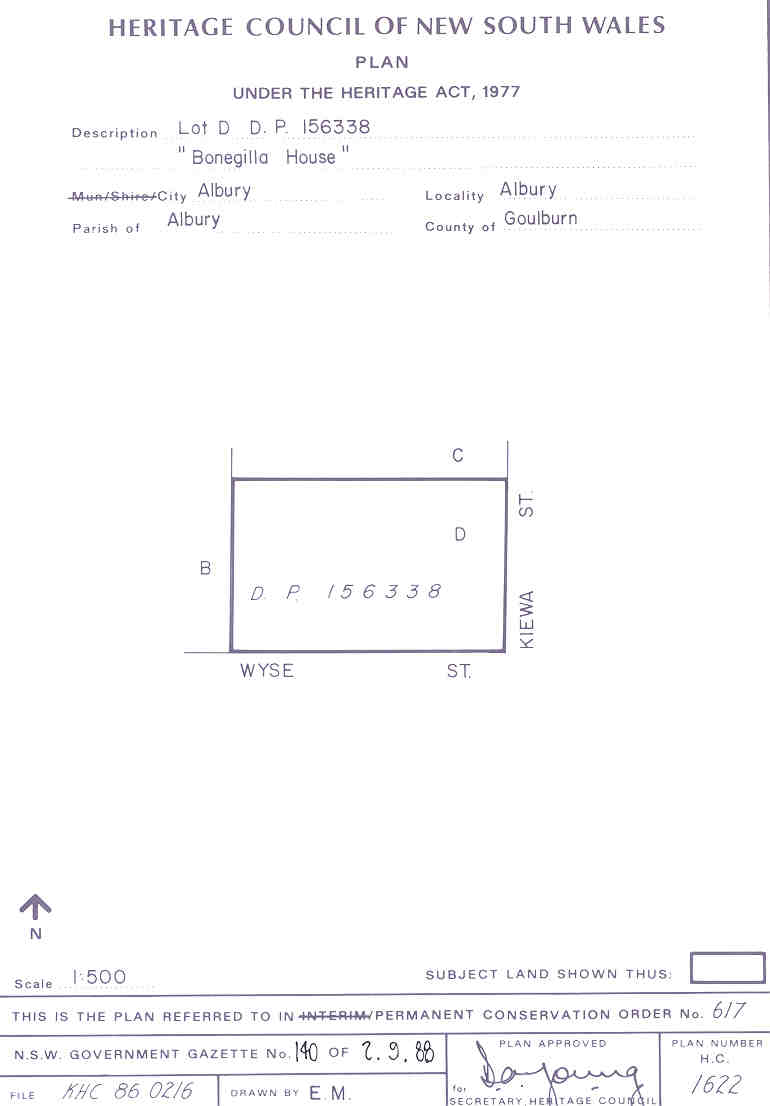
- Heritage boundaries

- Location within New South Wales Location within Australia
- 36.0758°S 146.9162°E
- Location: 587 Kiewa Street, Albury, City of Albury, New South Wales, Australia

New South Wales Heritage Register
- Official name: Bonegilla House; Grace-evelyn Lodge
- Type: state heritage (built)
- Designated: 2 April 1999
- Reference no.: 617
- Type: House
- Category: Residential buildings (private)

Bonegilla House is a heritage-listed house at 587 Kiewa Street, Albury, in the Riverina region of New South Wales, Australia. It is also known as Grace-evelyn Lodge. It was added to the New South Wales State Heritage Register on 2 April 1999.

== Heritage listing ==
Bonegilla House was listed on the New South Wales State Heritage Register on 2 April 1999. It was described as a good example of mid-Victorian architecture and part of a corner group.
