= David Farley =

David Farley may refer to:

- David Farley (politician) (born 1957), Australian politician
- David Farley (writer) (born 1971), American author
- David Farley (fl. 1990s–2000s), cartoonist who created Doctor Fun
- David Farley, software engineer who popularized the continuous delivery idea
