= Lavington Square Shopping Centre =

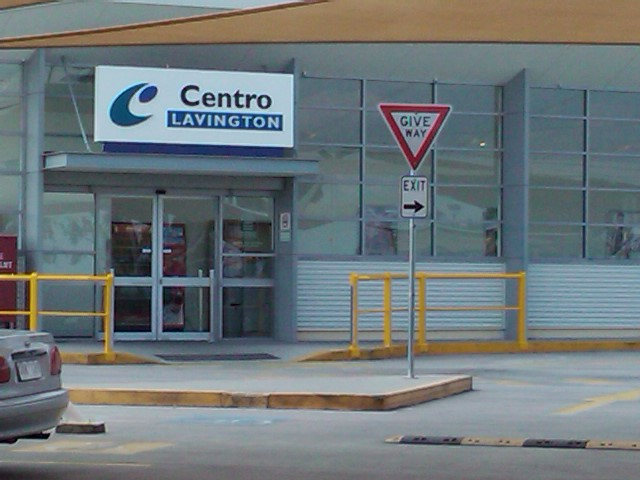
- Upper level car park entrance
- Location: Lavington, New South Wales, Australia
- Coordinates: 36.04841°S 146.93515°E
- Address: Griffith Road
- Opened: July 1979
- Developer: RDC Properties; T & G Mutual Life Assurance Society
- Manager: Region Group
- Owner: Region Group
- Num. of stores: 57
- Num. of anchor tenants: 2
- Floor area: 20,488 m^{2} (220,530 sq ft)
- Floors: 2 (including second story parking)
- Parking: 1,036
- Website: lavingtonsquare.com.au

Lavington Square Shopping Centre is an enclosed sub-regional shopping centre, in Lavington, a northern suburb of Albury, New South Wales that opened in 1979. As of June 2023, the centre has 57 stores and is anchored by Big W and Woolworths. The Lavington Australia Post retail shop is also located within the centre.

== History ==
Plans to develop a shopping centre in the suburb were announced in the late 1970s, with the $10.8 million development drawing some criticism from the Albury-Wodonga Development Corporation. The corporation believed the development would stifle commercial development and devalue land in the nearby suburb of Thurgoona, thus reducing capacity to make repayments on loans used to finance rapid growth and expansion of the twin cities.

On 30 July 1979 the new centre, named Border Shoppingtown, was opened by Premier Neville Wran. It was built by developers RDC Properties and T & G Mutual Life Assurance Society on the site of former orchard. At its opening, the centre provided over 11,600 m^{2} (125,000 sq ft) of floor space dedicated to two anchor tenants, a Woolworths supermarket and a Big W discount department store. In addition, the centre contained 37 smaller speciality retailers, three kiosks and 850 parking spaces.

Following its sale new owners, the name was changed to Lavington Square in 1988, ahead of a planned $2 million expansion; by this time, the centre had attracted a third major retailer, Fosseys. Completion of these extensions allowed the Lavington post office to relocate inside the centre from 1993.

It was also known as Centro Lavington for some time, but then returned to the Lavington Square name in 2013.

- 1996 saw the shopping centre gain extensions including a fresh food area.
- In 2004–06, when known as "Centro Lavington", the shopping centre went under a major redevelopment with work beginning July 2004 and adding a 350-seat Diners Life food court, a Fresh Life precinct and 20 new specialty stores including Best & Less, The Reject Shop and a refurbishment of Big W. Local construction group Zauner acquired the $22 million contract to build and construct the shopping centre. The centre was officially opened on 16 March 2006 at a cost of $33 million.

== Anchor tenants ==
- Woolworths
- Big W
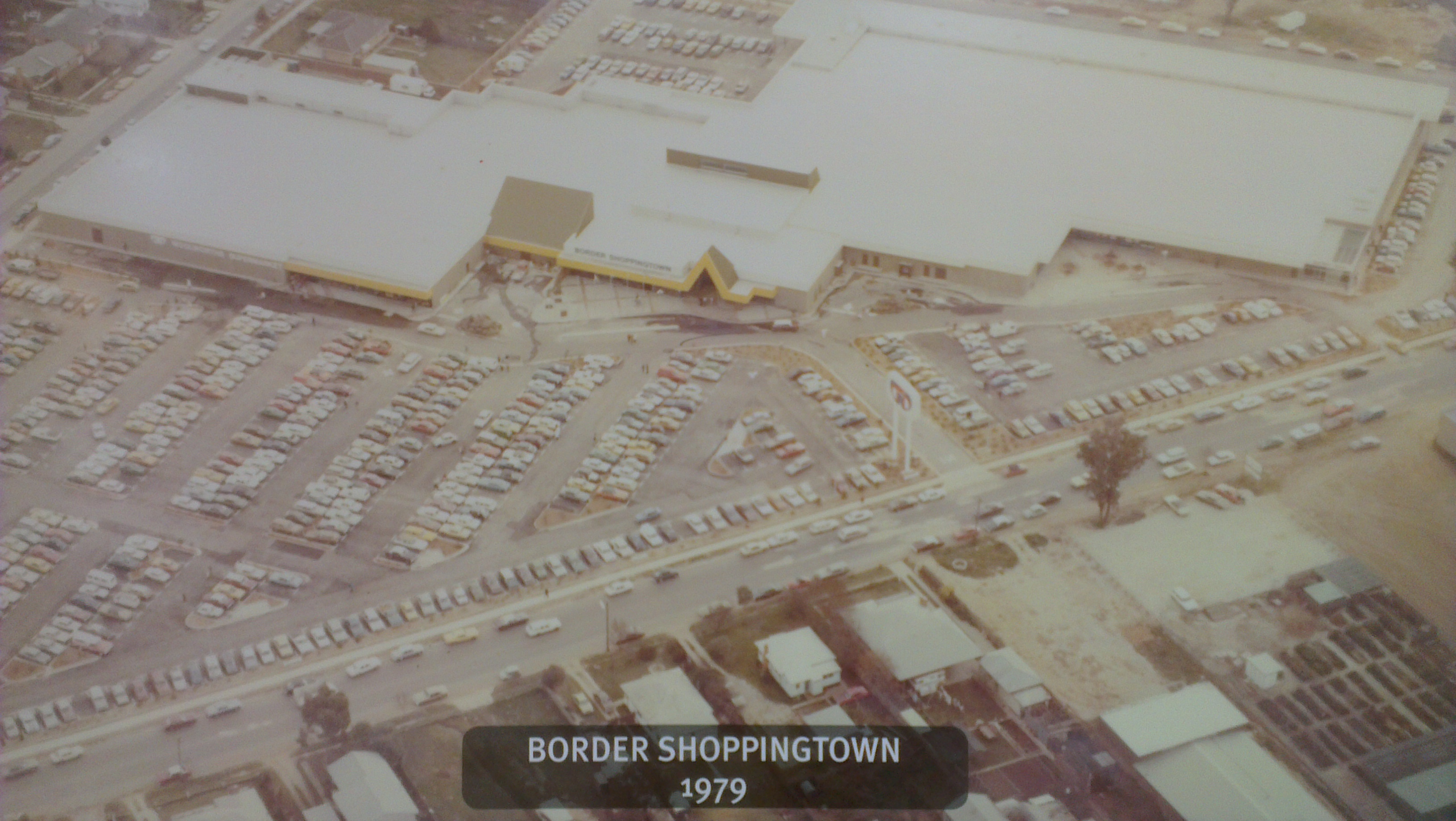
Photograph taken of an aerial shot of Border Shopping Town on public display at Lavington Square

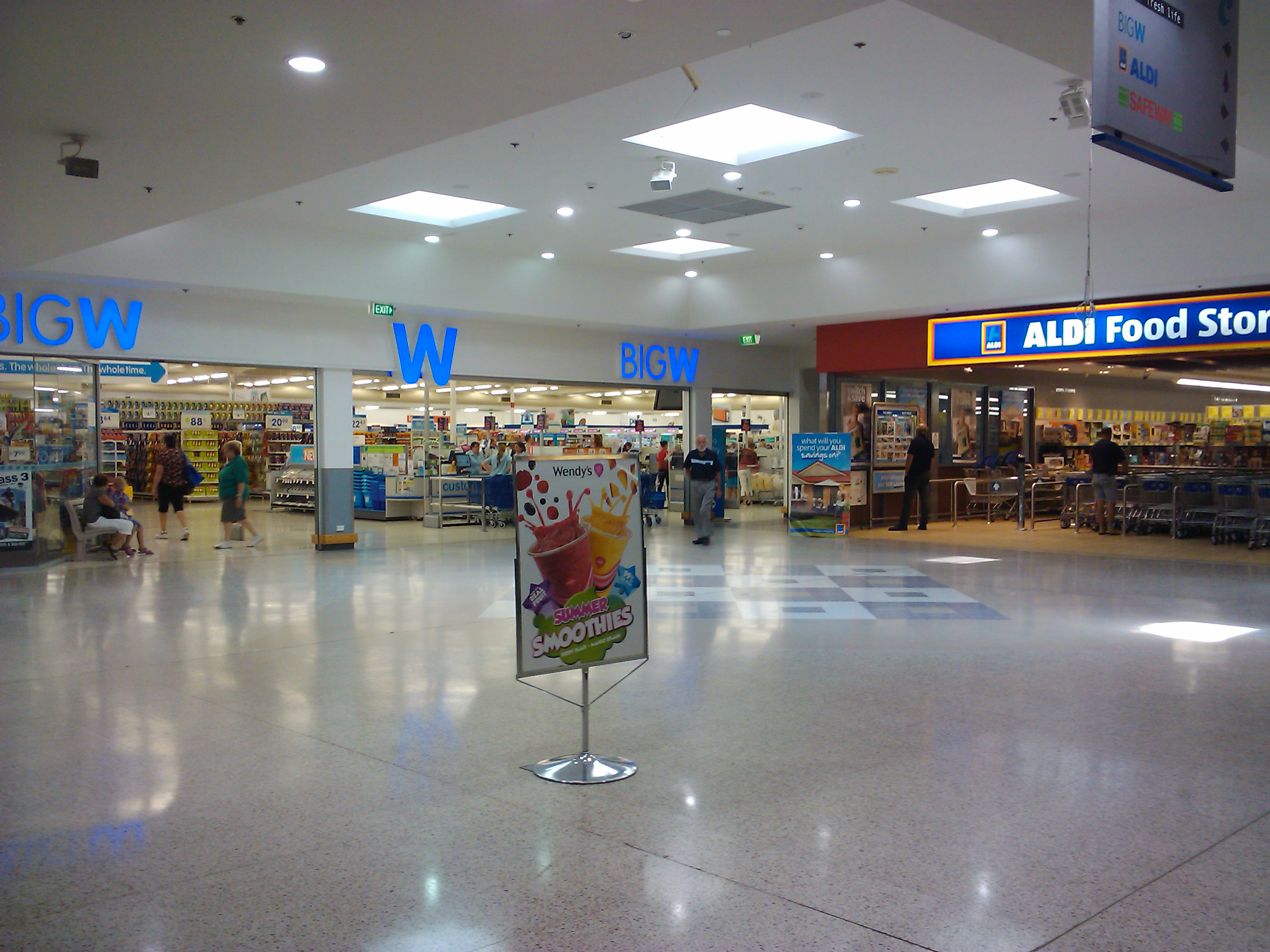
Big W and Aldi
