= The Carriageway =

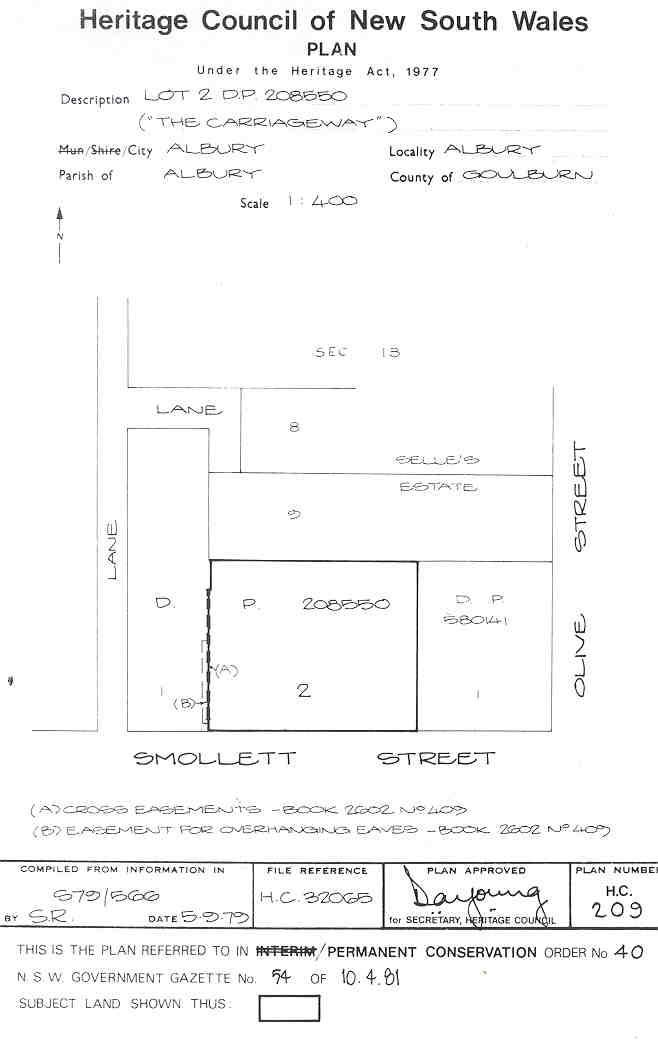
- Heritage boundaries

- Location within New South Wales Location within Australia
- 36.0828°S 146.9174°E
- Location: 506–508 Smollett Street, Albury, City of Albury, New South Wales, Australia

Site notes
- Owner: D+K Investments Pty Ltd

New South Wales Heritage Register
- Official name: The Carriageway
- Type: state heritage (built)
- Designated: 2 April 1999
- Reference no.: 40
- Type: Town House
- Category: Residential buildings (private)

The Carriageway is a heritage-listed town house at 506–508 Smollett Street, Albury, New South Wales, Australia. The property is owned by D+K Investments Pty Ltd. It was added to the New South Wales State Heritage Register on 2 April 1999.

== History ==
The Carriageway is believed to have been built c. 1860, during Albury's boom period as a border post and steamer port and has been used as an inn or hostel, as well as a private residence later.

In October 1978 the Heritage Council received a request from the National Trust of Australia (NSW) for protection under the Heritage Act for The Carriageway. At that time the National Trust and the Albury Historical Society was concerned for the future of The Carriageway as it was being offered for sale by auction and its future was insecure through change of ownership.

A section 130 Order under the Heritage Act was placed over The Carriageway on 10 November 1978.

The Carriageway went to auction but was passed in at $50,000 and subsequently purchased by a local medical practitioner. The building was then offered for lease as commercial premises. On 6 September 1979 the Heritage Council resolved to recommend an Interim Heritage Order to the Minister in view of the threat of redevelopment to render the building suitable for commercial use.

An Interim Heritage Order was placed over the property on 26 October 1979.

In view of the building's architectural merit and significance, a Permanent Conservation Order was placed over the property on 10 April 1981,

Modifications in 1985 involved internal conversion into 2 suites of offices downstairs and two separate apartments upstairs, together with restoration work to interior and exterior and construction of independent staircases at the rear to the upstairs apartments. In 1991, the building was subdivided into 4 strata titles, with no change to the fabric.

It was transferred to the State Heritage Register on 2 April 1999.

== Description ==
The Carriageway is a mid-Victorian residential building. It consists of a pair of substantial two-storey town-houses of brick construction and terrace form with a central carriageway. The building is unusual in its roof form, the elevation to Smollet Street being composed of four equal jerkinhead gables. Other distinguishing features include stuccoed decorations such as quoinstones, gable plaques and elaborate window and door surrounds. The full-length semi-cantilevered balcony features exceptionally rich balustrade and valence panels and has an elaborate iron palisade front fence.

There is a rear service wing that encloses a courtyard.

== Heritage listing ==
The Carriageway is believed to have been built c. 1860, during Albury's boom period. It is a mid-Victorian residential building consisting of a pair of substantial two-storey town-houses of brick construction and terrace form with a central carriageway. It is one of the oldest mid-Victorian residential buildings remaining in Albury and it is an unusual and elaborate example of its type. Its architectural form and detail is distinctive and inventive. It is a rare example of compact urban housing from the 19th century surviving in a distant inland town and makes a most distinctive contribution to the rich townscape of Albury.

The Carriageway was listed on the New South Wales State Heritage Register on 2 April 1999 having satisfied the following criteria.

The place is important in demonstrating the course, or pattern, of cultural or natural history in New South Wales.

The Carriageway is believed to have been built c. 1860, during Albury's boom period. It is one of the oldest mid-Victorian residential buildings remaining in Albury.

The place is important in demonstrating aesthetic characteristics and/or a high degree of creative or technical achievement in New South Wales.

The Carriageway is an unusual and elaborate example of its type. Its architectural form and detail is distinctive and inventive. It is a rare example of compact urban housing from the 19th century surviving in a distant inland town, and makes a most distinctive contribution to the rich townscape of Albury. It is a mid-Victorian residential building consisting of a pair of substantial two-storey town-houses of brick construction and terrace form with a central carriageway.
