= Murray High School, Lavington =

Murray High School

Location
- Kaitlers Road, Lavington, Albury, New South Wales; Australia; 36°02′00″S 146°56′41″E

Information
- Type: Government-funded co-educational comprehensive secondary day school
- Motto: Learn to Live
- Established: 1976; 50 years ago
- School district: Riverina
- Educational authority: NSW Department of Education
- Principal: Norman Johnson-Meader
- Teaching staff: 53.3 FTE (2025)
- Years: 7 to 12
- Enrolment: ~575 students (2025)
- Campus type: Regional
- Colours: Blue and yellow
- Website: murray-h.schools.nsw.gov.au

Murray High School is a government-funded co-educational comprehensive secondary day school, located in Lavington, New South Wales, Australia.

Established in 1976, the school enrolled approximately 575 students in 2025, from Year 7 to Year 12, of whom 9 per cent identify as Indigenous Australians and 18 per cent from a language background other than English. The school is operated by the NSW Department of Education; and the current principal is Norman Johnson-Meader.

The inaugural principal of Murray High School was H. Lyle Ingram (1976–1981).

== Facilities ==
Murray High school's facilities include:

- Five computer rooms
- Eight work rooms for the visual arts, woodwork, metalwork and technical drawing disciplines
- Six science laboratories with all necessary equipment
- Two industrial kitchens, fully equipped
- Music and drama faculties
- Twenty class rooms
- A computerised library with study areas and extensive resource collections
- A multipurpose gymnasium, basketball courts, cricket nets, hockey field and an oval
- All rooms except woodwork and metalwork are equipped with projectors

== Notable alumni ==
- Tony Armstrong – Australian rules footballer
- Carly Findlay – Australian writer and speaker; activist on disability issues
- Angela Iannotta – former soccer player and now soccer coach; represented the Matildas
- Lauren Jackson AO – former basketball player; represented Australia at the 2000 Sydney and 2004 Athens Olympics; captained the Opals
- Lee Kernaghan OAM – country music singer, songwriter and guitarist
- Brett Kirk – former Australian rules footballer and now coach; played with and captained the Sydney Swans

== See also ==
- List of government schools in New South Wales: G–P
- List of schools in the Riverina
- Education in Australia
