= North Albury, New South Wales =

Coordinates: 36.06°S 146.93°E

North Albury Albury, New South Wales
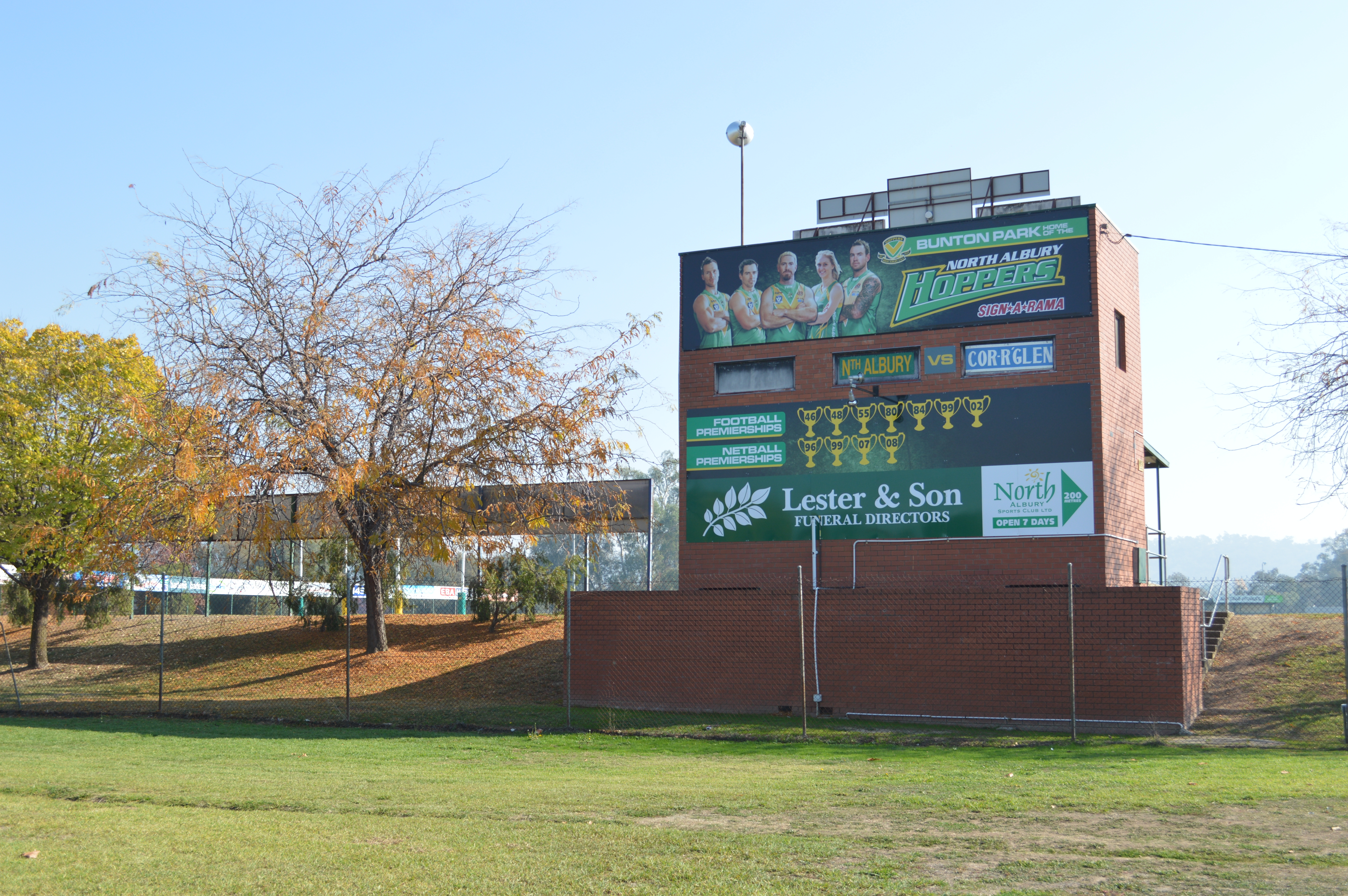
- Bunton Park, the home of North Albury Football Club
- Population: 5,976 (2011 census)
  - Density: 1,013/km^{2} (2,623/sq mi)
- Postcode(s): 2640
- Area: 5.9 km^{2} (2.3 sq mi)
- LGA(s): City of Albury
- State electorate(s): Albury
- Federal division(s): Farrer
Suburbs around North Albury:
Hamilton Valley	Lavington	Thurgoona
Glenroy	North Albury	Thurgoona
West Albury	Central Albury	East Albury

North Albury is a suburb of the city of Albury, New South Wales, located north of the Albury Central Business District. At the 2011 census, North Albury had a population of 5,967.

North Albury lies on the mostly flat area adjacent to Nail Can Hill, on the Murray River floodplain, and is bordered by Glenroy to the west, Lavington to the north, Thurgoona to the east, and Central Albury to the south. North Albury is a mostly residential area. Features of the area include Albury Racecourse, Albury Showground, Pioneer Cemetery, Frederick Park and 5 schools. North albury also has its own local football club located in the middle of North Albury, they are the North Albury Football Club.

== Geography ==
North Albury is bound to the north by Union Street, to the east by Dallinger Road and Fallon Street, to the south by the Bungambrawatha Creek and Ryan Road and to the west by Burrows Road. North Albury is mostly residential. Most of the area is flat, except for a few hills that are a part of Nail can in the west. It contains schools including the Scots School Albury and Albury North Public School.

== Residents ==
At the 2011 Census, the population of North Albury was 5,976. The most common religious affiliation was Catholic, followed by 'No Religion', then Anglican, and the weekly median household income was $802, below the Australian average of $1234. The median age was 37.

== See also ==
- North Albury Football Club
