= Hamilton Valley, New South Wales =

Coordinates: 36.038°S 146.92°E

Hamilton Valley
- Suburb
- Interactive map of Hamilton Valley
- Country: Australia
- State: New South Wales
- City: Albury
- LGA: City of Albury

Government
  - State electorate: Albury
  - Federal division: Farrer

Population
  - Total: 566 (2016 census)
Suburbs around Hamilton Valley
Table Top/Ettamogah	Table Top/Ettamogah	Springdale Heights
Splitters Creek	Hamilton Valley	Lavington
Splitters Creek	Glenroy	North Albury

Hamilton Valley is a suburb of the city of Albury, New South Wales, located north-west of the Albury Central Business District and west of Lavington. At the 2016 census, Hamilton Valley had a population of 566, although the area covered in the Census includes Splitters Creek and does not include some parts of Hamilton Valley. As a result, the population was probably closer to 450.

Hamilton Valley lies in a valley that broadly separates the Nail Can Hill and Black Ranges. It is surrounded by Table Top/Ettamogah to the north, Lavington to the east, Splitters Creek to the west and Glenroy to the south.

== Geography ==
Hamilton Valley is a developing residential suburb but has large rural areas. The valley is located on a branch of the Bungambrawatha Creek heading out towards Jindera. It is bound by Urana Road, Reservoir Road to the east, Glenroy to the south and Splitters Creek to the west.

== Sport ==
Hamilton Valley plays host to the Lavington Sports Ground which is the ground of the Lavington Panthers Football Club.

== Residents ==
At the 2016 census, the population of Hamilton Valley was 566; however the area covered is considerably different from that of the real suburb (see above). The most common religion was Catholic, followed by Anglican, and the average household income was $1,472, above the Australian average of $1,438. The median age was 31.
