= Elm Court, Albury =

Elm Court
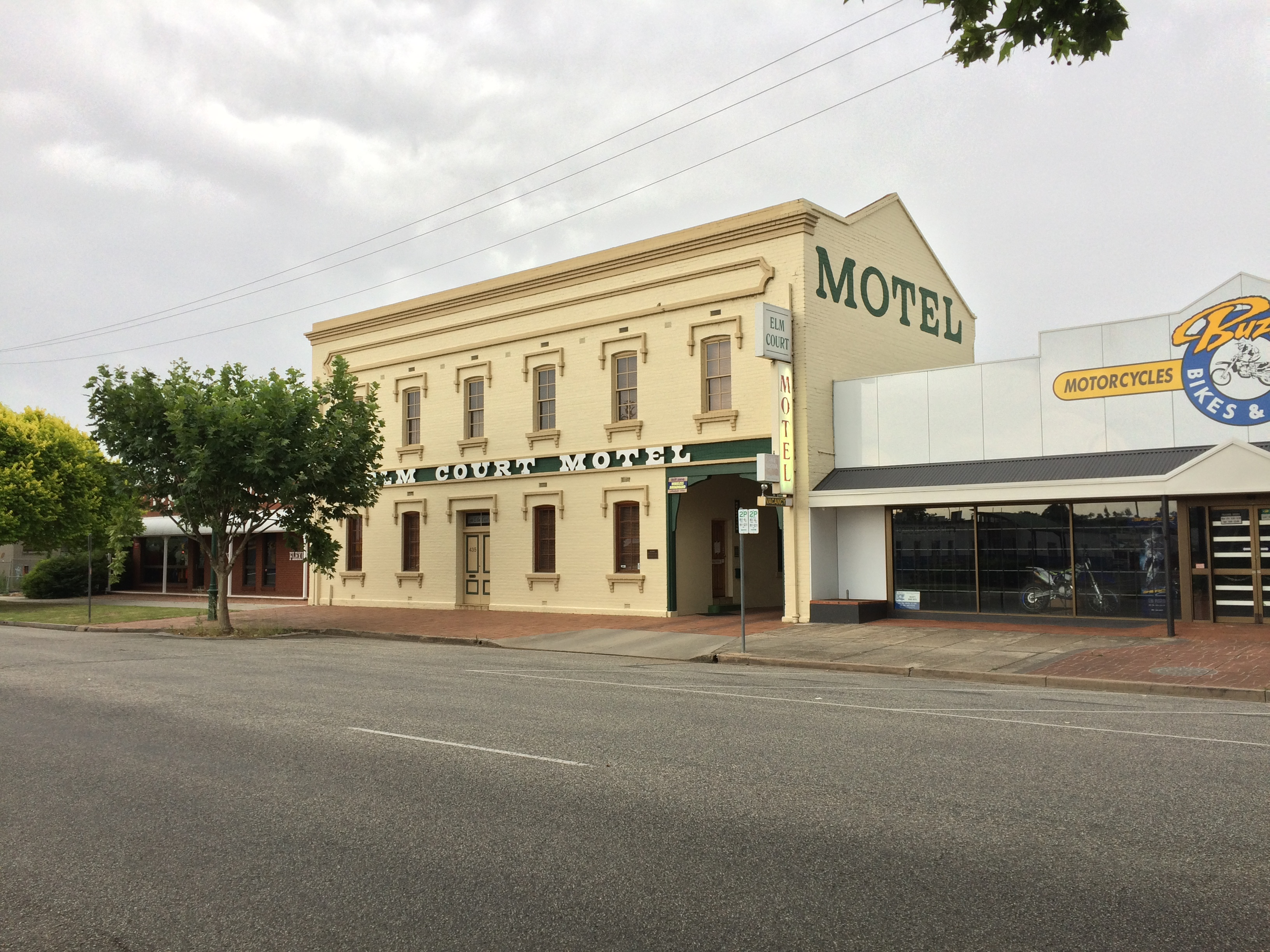
- Elm Court Motel, 2017

- Location within New South Wales Location within Australia
- 36.0837°S 146.9121°E
- Location: 435 Townsend Street, Albury, City of Albury, New South Wales, Australia

History
- Built: 1885–

Site notes
- Architect(s): Gordon and Gordon
- Owner: Indexe Pty Ltd

New South Wales Heritage Register
- Official name: Elm Court
- Type: state heritage (built)
- Designated: 2 April 1999
- Reference no.: 140
- Type: Other – Commercial
- Category: Commercial

Elm Court is a heritage-listed former carriage house and harness workshop in Albury, a city in the Riverina region of New South Wales, Australia. It was designed by Gordon and Gordon and built in 1885. The property located at 435 Townsend Street now operates as a motel. It was added to the New South Wales State Heritage Register on 2 April 1999.

== History ==
Elm Court was constructed as a coach building and harness workshop for James Higgins, with a residence on the upper floor. Higgins opened for business in 1888.

It was converted into a motel in the mid-1980s.

== Description ==
Red brick, two-storey construction in the Georgian style. The ground floor has a large, wide door in the northern end of the eastern façade, reflecting its original purpose as a coach building business.

== Heritage listing ==
Elm Court was constructed in c.1880 as a coach building and harness making establishment with a residence on the second floor. The business, during its operation, added substantially to the economy of Albury. Currently it is a contributory item to the historic character of Albury.

Early coach industry in Albury – important for its silhouette and several recyclings.

Elm Court was listed on the New South Wales State Heritage Register on 2 April 1999.
