= Lavington, New South Wales =

Coordinates: 36.05°S 146.933°E

Lavington (NSW)
- Suburb
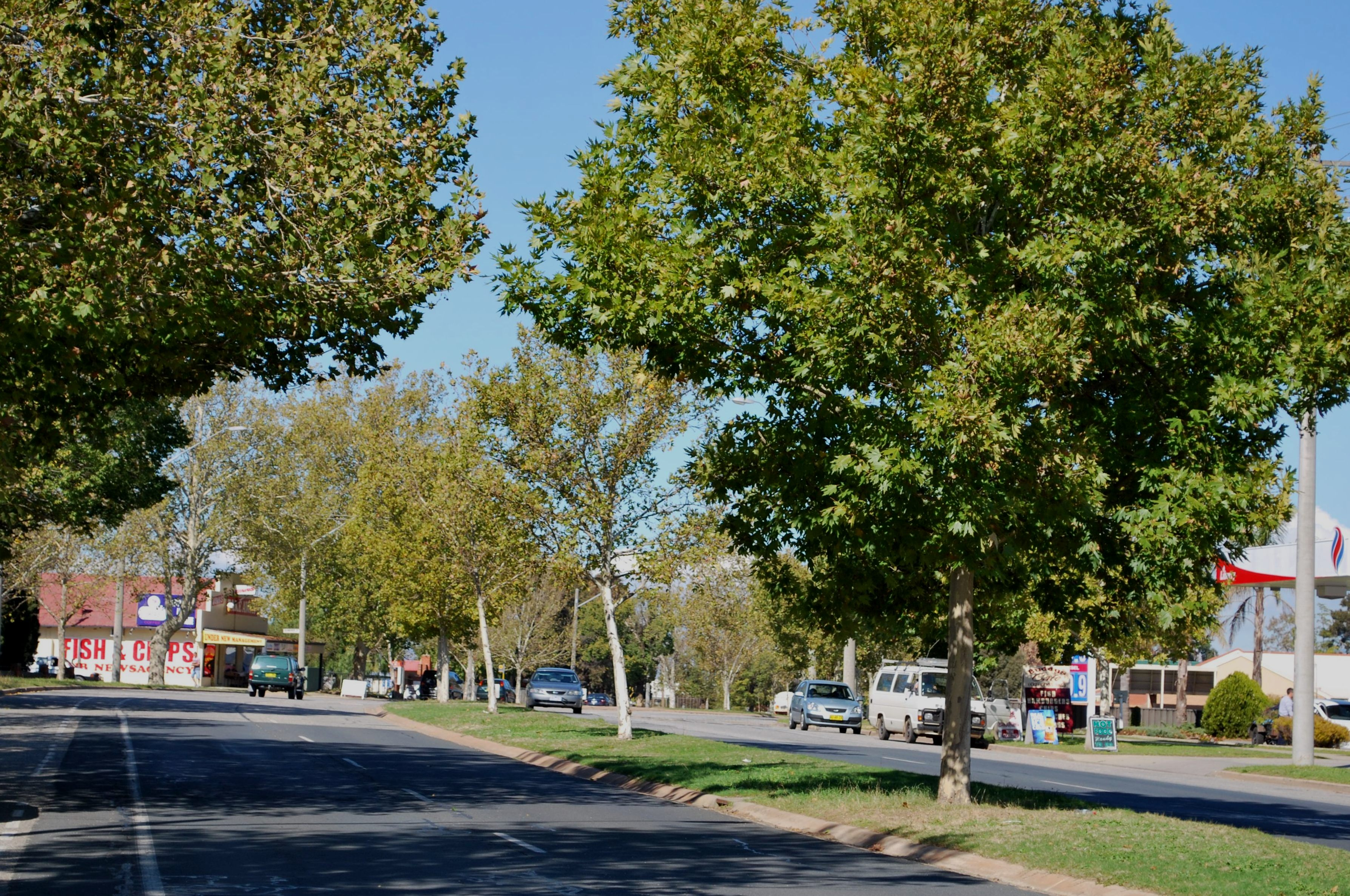
- Urana Rd, Lavington
- Interactive map of Lavington (NSW)
- Country: Australia
- State: New South Wales
- City: Albury
- LGA: City of Albury
- Location: 6 km (3.7 mi) N of Albury

Government
  - State electorate: Albury
  - Federal division: Farrer

Area
  - Total: 20 km^{2} (7.7 sq mi)

Population
  - Total: 13,073 (2021 census)
  - Density: 650/km^{2} (1,700/sq mi)
- Postcode: 2641
Suburbs around Lavington (NSW)
Table Top/Ettamogah	Springdale Heights	Table Top/Ettamogah
Hamilton Valley	Lavington (NSW)	Thurgoona
Glenroy	North Albury	East Albury

Lavington is the largest suburb of the city of Albury, New South Wales, Australia. At the 2021 census, Lavington had a population of 13,073. Lavington is a mostly flat area near Nail Can Hill to the west, and is bordered by Thurgoona to the east, Hamilton Valley to the west, Springdale Heights to the north, and North Albury to the south. Lavington is mostly residential, but has significant rural areas in the north-west and a commercial area. Features include Lavington Square Shopping Centre, Lavington Swim Centre, Jelbart Park and 5 schools (Lavington East Public, Lavington Public, Hume Public, Holy Spirit School (Catholic) and Murray High School). Lavington is the second major centre of the City of Albury, with its own commercial CBD.

== History ==
Before European settlement, Aboriginals who lived in the area were of the Wiradjuri tribe. On the 15 June 1909 Lavington was officially named, having previously been known as Black Range. Once a prune-growing, orchard and gold mining area, Lavington has slowly changed to become a locality with many shops and parks. Where once the township was centred around the Lavington Hall and the Lavington Public School, near where Urana Road crosses the Bungambrawatha Creek (which has been known to yield many kinds of local crayfish or yabbies), as it became a suburb of Albury the shopping and business areas have concentrated around the junction of Griffith and Urana Roads.

Lavington was formerly part of the Greater Hume Shire but was added to the City of Albury during the 1950s, with the old boundary between the two local government areas being ascribed by Union Road. Much of Albury's subsequent residential and industrial expansion has occurred in the Lavington locality, particularly after the establishment of the Albury-Wodonga Development Corporation in the early 1970s. Springdale Heights, north of Lavington was built in the 1970s and Hamilton Valley (a suburb west of Lavington) and Norris Park (a housing estate in western Lavington) were established in the 1990s.

Lavington celebrated its 100th anniversary of being proclaimed a suburb on the weekend starting 13 July 2009, with community activities at Lavington Square Shopping Centre, Lavington Panthers Oval, Lavington Library and the Lavington Hall in Urana Road.

== Geography ==
Lavington is located in the flat floodplain of the Murray River, on an area crossed by the Bungambrawatha Creek, with Nail Can Hill to the west and the Black Range to the north. Lavington is bound by Union Road to the south, the railway/freeway line to the east, Kaitlers Road to the north, and an extended Burrows Road, Reservoir Road and Urana Road to the west.

Lavington's retail and business are located primarily around Griffith Road, Wagga Road, and Urana Road. The area is served by the Lavington Square Shopping Centre formally called Centro Lavington. Currently, Woolworths and Big W is the major anchor tenants, with the Aldi relocating to the former WOW Sight and Sound building on Wagga Rd.

Following the Hume Freeway Albury-Wodonga bypass, many of the business located on the former Hume Highway fell in to decline or failed. The section running through Lavington known as Wagga Road suffered the closure of many former car dealerships, petrol stations and cafes that previously relied on pass-through traffic. The local council has made efforts to beautify the area with new median strips, parking and planting with the hopes of creating a renewal for the area.

== Sport ==
There are many sporting groups in Lavington including ones for soccer, Australian rules football, cricket, netball, softball, water polo, swimming and tennis. There is a BMX and skate park.

Melrose FC and Albury United SC are soccer clubs who compete in the Albury Wodonga Football Association. They are one of six soccer teams located in Albury.

The Nail Can Hill Run is an annual fun run that has been going for around 30 years. The event is usually held in early May and covers a hilly cross-country course of 11.3 km starting at Lavington Panthers Club, following the ridge of hills west of Lavington, Glenroy and Albury, eventually finishing at riverside parkland in Albury. There is also a mountain bicycling race over the same course run on the same day.

The Lavington Sports Ground, located in the suburb's west, is the Albury-Wodonga region's prominent sporting venue. In addition to being the home ground of the Lavington Panthers (formerly Blues) Australian rules football club who play in the Ovens & Murray Football League. When Lavington joined the Ovens & Murray Football League from the Hume Football League in 1977, the newly formed East Lavington Football Club was established and played in the Hume Football League from 1977 until 1997.

The Lavington Sports Ground has hosted many AFL practice matches, the England v Zimbabwe fixture in the 1992 Cricket World Cup, New South Wales v England Tour Match (cricket) in 1990, one Sheffield Shield match between NSW and Victoria in 1989, and a couple of Australian Rugby League preseason grand finals during the mid-1990s, as well as other preseason games for the ARL and NRL competitions. Up until the 1980s, the Lavington Sports Carnival, incorporating the Lavington Gift, was staged at the ground.

The John Woodman Memorial Cycling Classic finish each year in front of the Lavington Hall, Urana Road.

== Demographics ==
At the 2021 Census, the population of Lavington was 13,073, a decrease from 14,274 in 1996.

- Aboriginal and Torres Strait Islander people made up 4.7% of the population.
- 78.0% of people were born in Australia. The next most common countries of birth were India 2.8%, England 1.6%, Bhutan 1.4%, Nepal 1.3% and New Zealand 1.1%.
- 81.5% of people spoke only English at home. Other languages spoken at home included Nepali 2.9% and Punjabi 2.3%.
- The most common responses for religion were No Religion 37.7%, Catholic 19.3% and Anglican 12.4%.
- The median weekly household income was $1130, below the Australian median of $1746.
- The median age was 40.
