= Model Store =

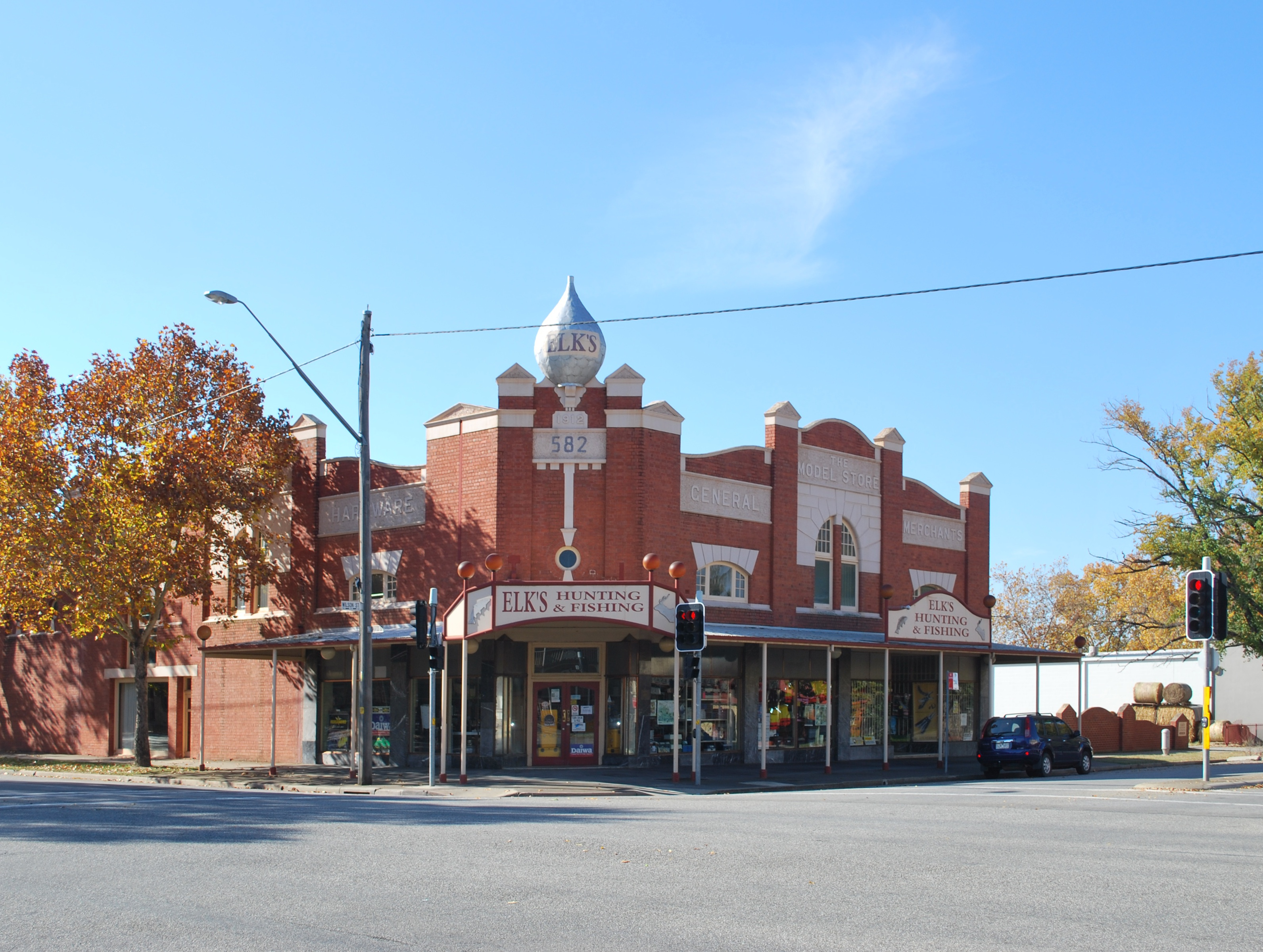
- Model Store, 2010

- Location within New South Wales Location within Australia
- 36.0768°S 146.9220°E
- Location: 582 David Street, Albury, City of Albury, New South Wales, Australia

New South Wales Heritage Register
- Official name: Model Store; Model Stores
- Type: state heritage (built)
- Designated: 2 April 1999
- Reference no.: 359
- Type: Commercial Office/Building
- Category: Commercial

Model Store is a heritage-listed commercial building at 582 David Street, Albury, City of Albury, New South Wales, Australia. It was added to the New South Wales State Heritage Register on 2 April 1999.

== Heritage listing ==
Model Store was listed on the New South Wales State Heritage Register on 2 April 1999, on the basis that it shows the earlier importance of Wilson Street and is a good representation of architecture of federation commercial styles.
