= Albury Wodonga Football Association =

- Founded: 1973
- First season: 1973
- Country: Australia
- Number of clubs: 12
- Level on pyramid: 9
- Domestic cup(s): Dockerty Cup; Australia Cup
- Website: AWFA.asn.au

The Albury Wodonga Football Association (AWFA) is a soccer league encompassing much of North East Victoria & the Southern Riverina. The association's headquarters and half of the clubs are based in the City Of Albury (New South Wales), and are affiliated under the auspices of Football New South Wales (FNSW). The clubs based in Victoria, whilst affiliated from a registration point of view with Football Federation Victoria (FFV), are governed by FNSW.. Their mission statement is to be an organisation which designs, organises, implements, and controls football activities; coordinates, advises and supports member clubs; represents the sport and its members at the regional, state and national level and plans and organises sponsorship and promotion so that people can participate, enjoy and achieve through playing football."

== History ==
The association was formed in 1973 as the "Albury Wodonga Soccer Association". The association was known as "Soccer Albury Wodonga" from the 1990s until the early 2000s, when the association was renamed as part of Football Federation Australia's re-branding of the game in Australia.

=== Format ===
Structure: Male	Structure: Female
Division 1 Men's; Division 2 Men's; Division 3 Men's; Over 35 Men's; Under 16 Boys; Under 14 Boys; Under 13 Boys; Under 12 Boys	Division 1 Women's; Division 2 Women's; Under 15 Girls; Under 13 Girls

The league sits below the Victorian State League Division 5 and forms a part of the "Ninth tier" of league soccer in Australia. It is primarily staged in the Australian winter and, in its current format, runs between March and September. The league comprises teams based in the Australian states of Victoria & New South Wales, while the Football Federation Victoria is the governing body.

Each league comprises twelve teams competing in a number of competition. Every team plays each other twice over the course of a 24-week season, with two general bye rounds.

Promotion and Relegation:
Currently there is no "Second Division" of the Albury Wodonga Football Association, so there is no promotion or relegation. The twelve clubs field teams in 14 competitions, nine of which are age-restricted competitions.

There is no promotion or relegation between the Albury Wodonga Football Association (Level 9) and the Victorian State League Division 5 (Level 8), however clubs may apply to join the VSL.

- The latest club to join the association was the "Cobram Roar" in 2016 from the "Goulburn North East Football Association".
- The most recent club to leave the association was the "Benalla Rovers" in 2015 for the "Goulburn North East Football Association".

=== Cups and Finals ===
==== Albury Wodonga Football Association League Cup ====
Currently the finals series also doubles as a "League Cup", where the top 8 teams play in a knockout style tournament over 3 weeks.

==== Dockerty Cup and Australia Cup ====
Since the 2016 season Albury Wodonga Football Association clubs have taken part in the Australia Cup preliminary rounds, which also double as the initial rounds of the Dockerty Cup. Fixtures are randomly drawn as single-leg knockout matches. Currently all Victorian Regional Leagues clubs enter at the "First Qualifying Round", and only the last 4 Victorian clubs will qualify for the final rounds of the competition (at the Round of 32). To date, no Albury Wodonga Football Association club has advanced beyond the fourth round.

Australia Cup Qualifiers

Club	Season	Round Reached
Cobram Roar FC	2016	First Qualifying Round
Cobram Roar FC	2017	Second Round
Cobram Roar FC	2018	First Qualifying Round
Myrtleford Savoy SC	2016	Third Round
Myrtleford Savoy SC	2017	First Round
Myrtleford Savoy SC	2018	Third Round
Myrtleford Savoy SC	2019	Second Qualifying Round
Twin City Wanderers FC	2014	Fourth Round
Twin City Wanderers FC	2016	Third Round
Twin City Wanderers FC	2017	First Round
Twin City Wanderers FC	2018	First Round
Twin City Wanderers FC	2019	First Round
Wangaratta City FC	2014	First Round
Wangaratta City FC	2016	Third Round
Wangaratta City FC	2017	Second Qualifying Round
Wangaratta City FC	2018	Second Round
Wangaratta City FC	2019	First Round

== Media coverage ==
Radio:
Radio station 2AY broadcasts a segment titled "The Critic" every Saturday morning between 10:00am and 1:00pm, while mainly focusing on the local Australian Football scene it occasionally covers the AWFA. ABC Goulburn Murray also covers the league during the "Local Grandstand" program every Saturday morning between 08:00am and 10:00am. Television:
Local TV news broadcasts from Prime7 News & WIN News air weekend match highlights including player and coaching staff interviews, as well as covering all scores.

Newspapers:
Print coverage is generally scant when compared to the Australian Football coverage in the region's major daily newspaper, "The Border Mail". More coverage is provided by local newspaper's "Wangaratta Chronicle", "The Alpine Observer", "Myrtleford Times".

Live Match Coverage:
live Twitter feeds of some matches are provided by a team of media representatives, this may very depending on clubs.

Video Highlights:
Albury Wodonga Football Association produce regular highlights videos which are published on social media and their respective association & club websites. Some clubs air a "TeamTV" channel via YouTube or club websites, covers AWFA team match highlights including player and coaching staff interviews.

== Albury Wodonga Football Association clubs ==
=== 2025 Affiliated Clubs ===
Club	Location	State	Venue	Est.	Joined	Div.1 Men's League Titles	Div.1 Men's Cup Titles	Div.1 Women's League Titles	Div.1 Women's Cup Titles	Link
Albury City	Lavington	NSW	Jelbart Park – East Field	1974	1974	7	9	5	6	ACFC
Albury Hotspurs	South Albury	NSW	Aloysius Park	1973	? (1974)	5	6	4	2	AHSC
Albury United	Lavington	NSW	Jelbart Park – West Field	1967	? (1975)	11	10	3	3	AUSC
Boomers (Note: "Boomers Football Club" were previously known as "Lavington Soccer Club" from establishment in 1956 to 1991, before renaming to "SS&A Boomers" from 1992 until 2010.)	Glenroy	NSW	Glen Park	1956	1973	4	3	11	9	BFC
Cobram Roar	Cobram	VIC	Cobram Showgrounds	2014	2016	1	0	0	0	CRFC
Melrose (Note: "Melrose Football Club" were previously known as "Melrose Park Rangers Soccer Club" from establishment in 1973 to 2001, before renaming to "Lavington Panthers Soccer Club" from 2002 until 2009.)	Lavington	NSW	Melrose Park	1973	1973	3	3	5	4	MFC
Myrtleford Savoy	Myrtleford	VIC	Savoy Park	1953	? (1977)	5	4	1	0	MSFC
St Pats (Note: "St Pats Football Club" were previously known as "St Patrick's Football Club" from establishment in 1976 until 2013.)	East Albury	NSW	Alexandra Park	1974	? (1978)	0	0	3	2	SPFC
Twin City Wanderers	Wodonga	VIC	Kelly Park	1973	1973	3	3	0	1	TCWFC
Wangaratta City	Wangaratta	VIC	South Wangaratta Reserve	1951	1977	5	3	0	0	WCFC
Wodonga Diamonds	West Wodonga	VIC	Diamonds on La Trobe	1974	? (1976)	7	9	6	10	WDFC
Wodonga Heart (Note: "Wodonga Heart Football Club" were previously known as "Wodonga City Soccer Club" from establishment in 1979 to 1993, then "Willow Park Panthers Soccer Club" from 1993 to 1995, before renaming to "Wodonga Panthers Football Club" from 1995 until 2011.)	Wodonga	VIC	Willow Park	1979	? (1986)	0	0	0	0	WHFC
Joined years are listed as "? (year)" as this is the first year listed below, and may have joined sooner.

=== Former affiliated clubs ===
Club	Founded	Location	Home ground	Website
Benalla Rovers	1954	Benalla	Churchill Reserve	https://web.archive.org/web/20170215014237/http://benallarovers.com.au/

== Honors ==
AWFA Division 1 Men League Champions (Summary)
Club	Occasions	Year
Albury United	11	1997, 1998, 1999, 2005, 2007, 2008, 2009, 2011, 2015, 2022. 2023
Wodonga Diamonds	7	1977, 1985, 1986, 1990, 2001, 2002, 2013
Albury City	7	1975, 1976, 1978, 1979, 1983, 1992, 1994
Albury Hotspurs	5	1987, 1988, 1991, 2000, 2003
Wangaratta City	5	1980, 1981, 1982, 1996, 2019
Myrtleford Savoy	5	2006, 2017, 2018, 2024, 2025
Boomers FC	3	1984, 1995, 2012
Melrose FC	3	1989, 1993, 2004
Twin City Wanderers	3	1974, 2010, 2014
Cobram Roar	1	2016
Albury Rovers	1	1973

AWFA Division 1 Men Cup Winners (Summary)
Club	Occasions	Year
Albury United	10	1997, 2002, 2004, 2005, 2006, 2007, 2012, 2022, 2023, 2024
Wodonga Diamonds	9	1977, 1981, 1989, 1990, 2000, 2001, 2011, 2013, 2014
Albury City	9	1974, 1976, 1978, 1979, 1983, 1984, 1985, 1992, 1994
Albury Hotspurs	6	1975, 1980, 1987, 1988, 1999, 2003
Boomers FC	4	1973, 1996, 1998, 2009
Wangaratta City	4	1982, 1995, 2015, 2019
Melrose	3	1986, 1991, 1993
Myrtleford Savoy	4	2016, 2017, 2018, 2025
Twin City Wanderers	3	1973, 2008, 2010

AWFA League Div 1 Men			AWFA Cup Div 1 Men			
Year	Winner	Runner-Up	Year	Winner	Runner-Up	Score
2025	Myrtleford Savoy	Albury Hotspurs	2025	Myrtleford Savoy	Albury Hotspurs	4-1
2024	Myrtleford Savoy	Albury United	2024	Albury United	Myrtleford Savoy	4-3
2023	Albury United	Cobram Roar	2023	Albury United	Myrtleford Savoy	2-1
2022	Albury United	Cobram Roar	2022	Albury United	Wangaratta City	3-1
2019	Wangaratta City	Myrtleford Savoy	2019	Wangaratta City	Myrtleford Savoy	4-0
2018	Myrtleford Savoy	Wangaratta City	2018	Myrtleford Savoy	Boomers FC	3–1
2017	Myrtleford Savoy	Albury United	2017	Myrtleford Savoy	Cobram Roar	2–0
2016	Cobram Roar	Myrtleford Savoy	2016	Myrtleford Savoy	Albury City	2–0
2015	Albury United	Boomers FC	2015	Wangaratta City	Myrtleford Savoy	5–2
2014	Twin City Wanderers	Boomers FC	2014	Wodonga Diamonds	Twin City Wanderers	5–3
2013	Wodonga Diamonds	Myrtleford Savoy	2013	Wodonga Diamonds	Myrtleford Savoy	5–1
2012	Boomers FC	Myrtleford Savoy	2012	Albury United	Melrose Park Rangers	3–2
2011	Albury United	Melrose Park Rangers	2011	Wodonga Diamonds	Albury United	3–2
2010	Twin City Wanderers	Lavington Panthers	2010	Twin City Wanderers	Lavington Panthers	4–2
2009	Albury United	SS&A Boomers	2009	SS&A Boomers	Twin City Wanderers	1–0
2008	Albury United	Myrtleford Savoy	2008	Twin City Wanderers	SS&A Boomers	2–1
2007	Albury United	Myrtleford Savoy	2007	Albury United	Myrtleford Savoy	2–1
2006	Myrtleford Savoy	Albury United	2006	Albury United	Myrtleford Savoy	5–1
2005	Albury United	Albury Hotspurs	2005	Albury United	Albury Hotspurs	3–1
2004	Lavington Panthers	Albury Hotspurs	2004	Albury United	Lavington Panthers	1–0
2003	Albury Hotspurs	Albury United	2003	Albury Hotspurs	Wodonga Diamonds	6–1
2002	Wodonga Diamonds	Albury United	2002	Albury United	Wodonga Diamonds	2–0
2001	Wodonga Diamonds	Albury Hotspurs	2001	Wodonga Diamonds	Albury United	2–1
2000	Albury Hotspurs	Albury United	2000	Wodonga Diamonds	Wangaratta City	1–0
1999	Albury United	SS&A Boomers	1999	Albury Hotspurs	Albury United	3–1
1998	Albury United	Albury City	1998	SS&A Boomers	Wodonga Diamonds	2–1
1997	Albury United	St Pats	1997	Albury United	St Pats	2–1
1996	Wangaratta City	Melrose Park Rangers	1996	SS&A Boomers	Wangaratta City	4–2
1995	SS&A Boomers	Wodonga Diamonds	1995	Wangaratta City	SS&A Boomers	4–1
1994	Albury City	Albury United	1994	Albury City	St Pats	2–1
1993	Melrose Park Rangers	Wodonga Diamonds	1993	Melrose Park Rangers	Albury Hotspurs	4–2
1992	Albury City	Melrose Park Rangers	1992	Albury City	Melrose Park Rangers	3–1
1991	Albury Hotspurs	Melrose Park Rangers	1991	Melrose Park Rangers	Albury Hotspurs	4–1
1990	Wodonga Diamonds	Albury Hotspurs	1990	Wodonga Diamonds	Albury Hotspurs	1–0
1989	Melrose Park Rangers	Twin City Wanderers	1989	Wodonga Diamonds	Melrose Park Rangers	1–0
1988	Albury Hotspurs	Twin City Wanderers	1988	Albury Hotspurs	Wodonga Diamonds	1–0
1987	Albury Hotspurs	Wodonga Diamonds	1987	Albury Hotspurs	Lavington	2–1
1986	Wodonga Diamonds	Wangaratta City	1986	Melrose Park Rangers	Albury Hotspurs	2–1
1985	Wodonga Diamonds	Lavington	1985	Albury City	Wodonga Diamonds	6–4
1984	Lavington	Albury City	1984	Albury City	Lavington	4–2
1983	Albury City	Lavington	1983	Albury City	Lavington	2–1
1982	Wangaratta City	Wodonga Diamonds	1982	Wangaratta City	Wodonga Diamonds	3–1
1981	Wangaratta City	Myrtleford Savoy	1981	Wodonga Diamonds	Wangaratta City	2–0
1980	Wangaratta City	Albury Hotspurs	1980	Albury Hotspurs	Myrtleford Savoy	1–0
1979	Albury City	Twin City Wanderers	1979	Albury City	Twin City Wanderers	2–1
1978	Albury City	Twin City Wanderers	1978	Albury City	Albury Hotspurs	5–3
1977	Wodonga Diamonds	Myrtleford Savoy	1977	Wodonga Diamonds	Myrtleford Savoy	4–1
1976	Albury City	Wodonga Diamonds	1976	Albury City	Wodonga Diamonds	3–1
1975	Albury City	Melrose Park Rangers	1975	Albury Hotspurs	Albury City	3–2
1974	Twin City Wanderers	Albury City	1974	Albury City	Melrose Park Rangers	2–0
1973	Albury Rovers	Melrose Park Rangers	1973	Lavington	Melrose Park Rangers	

AWFA League Div 1 Women			AWFA Cup Div 1 Women			
Year	Winner	Runner-Up	Year	Winner	Runner-Up	Score
2025	Albury Hotspurs	Boomers FC	2025	Boomers FC	Albury Hotspurs	1-0
2024	Albury Hotspurs	Melrose FC	2024	Albury Hotspurs	Melrose FC	2-0
2023	Albury Hotspurs	Albury United	2023	Albury United	Melrose FC	6-0
2022	Albury United	Albury Hotspurs	2022	Albury United	Albury Hotspurs	3-2
2019	St Pats	Albury United	2019	Wangaratta City	St Pats	3-0
2018	Albury City	Wangaratta City	2018	Albury City	Wangaratta City	3–2
2017	Albury City	Boomers FC	2017	Boomers FC	Albury City	1–0
2016	Boomers FC	Albury City	2016	Albury City	Boomers FC	9–7
2015	Albury City	Boomers FC	2015	Boomers FC	Albury United	2–1
2014	Wodonga Diamonds	Boomers FC	2014	Albury City	Boomers FC	3–1
2013	Boomers FC	Albury City	2013	Albury City	Boomers FC	1–0
2012	Albury City	Wodonga Diamonds	2012	Albury City	Boomers FC	2–1
2011	Boomers FC	Albury City	2011	Boomers FC	Albury City	
2010	Albury United	St Patricks	2010	Boomers FC	St Patricks	1–0
2009	SS&A Boomers	St Patricks	2009	SS&A Boomers	Albury City	2–0
2008	Myrtleford Savoy		2008	SS&A Boomers		
2007	Wodonga Diamonds	St Patricks	2007	Wodonga Diamonds	St Patricks	1–0
2006	SS&A Boomers	St Patricks	2006	St Patricks	SS&A Boomers	2–1
2005	SS&A Boomers	St Patricks	2005	SS&A Boomers	St Patricks	1–0
2004	St Patricks	Wodonga Diamonds	2004	Twin City Wanderers	SS&A Boomers	2–1
2003	St Patricks	Albury United	2003	St Patricks	SS&A Boomers	5–1
2002	Albury Hotspurs	SS&A Boomers	2002	Albury Hotspurs	SS&A Boomers	5–4
2001	SS&A Boomers	Wodonga Diamonds	2001	Wodonga Diamonds	SS&A Boomers	3–1
2000	Albury Hotspurs	SS&A Boomers	2000	SS&A Boomers	Albury Hotspurs	4–1
1999	SS&A Boomers	St Patricks	1999	Wodonga Diamonds	Albury Hotspurs	
1998	Wodonga Diamonds	SS&A Boomers	1998	Wodonga Diamonds	SS&A Boomers	
1997	Wodonga Diamonds	St Patricks	1997	Wodonga Diamonds	St Patricks	
1996	Wodonga Diamonds		1996	Wodonga Diamonds	St Patricks	
1995	Wodonga Diamonds		1995	Wodonga Diamonds	SS&A Boomers	
1994	SS&A Boomers		1994	Wodonga Diamonds	Albury Hotspurs	
1993	SS&A Boomers		1993	Wodonga Diamonds	SS&A Boomers	
1992	SS&A Boomers		1992			
1991	Albury United		1991	Albury United	Wodonga Diamonds	1–0
1990	Albury United		1990	Albury United	Albury Hotspurs	
1989			1989	Wodonga Diamonds	Myrtleford Savoy	
1988	Albury City		1988	Albury City		
1987			1987			
1986	Melrose Park Rangers		1986			
1985	Melrose Park Rangers		1985	Melrose Park Rangers		
1984	Melrose Park Rangers		1984	Melrose Park Rangers		
1983			1983			
1982			1982			
1981	Melrose Park Rangers	Wodonga Diamonds	1981	Melrose Park Rangers	St Patricks	1–0
1980	Melrose Park Rangers	Wodonga Diamonds	1980	Melrose Park Rangers	Albury City	4–0

Note: Information has been sourced from websites including those of Albury-Wodonga Football Association, Albury United and Albury Hotspurs.
