= Carly Findlay =

Australian writer and online influencer

- Born: 1981 (age 44–45); Albury, New South Wales
- Education: Murray High School, Lavington; La Trobe University; RMIT University
- Occupations: Writer; speaker; arts worker; appearance activist; disability and cancer advocate
- Spouse: Adam Morrow
- Parent(s): Roger & Jeanette Findlay

Carly Findlay (born 1981) is an Australian writer, speaker, arts worker and online influencer. Findlay describes herself as an 'appearance activist', and has been outspoken on a number of disability-related issues. She has been particularly vocal on the right to privacy of children with a disability as well as the importance of representation and inclusion of disabled people both in general life, and particularly in fashion. Findlay makes use of social media to document her love of fashion, food, as well as the treatment and ableism she faces because she has ichthyosis, a genetic disorder that affects her skin and hair. She has built a business and personal brand around being disabled.

== Early life and education ==
Findlay's parents courted illegally for four years in South Africa during the Apartheid and moved to Australia in order to marry in 1981. Her mother Jeanette was classified as coloured South African, while her father Roger was an Englishman.

Findlay was born on 8 December 1981 in Albury, New South Wales, three weeks premature and was diagnosed with a form of the genetic disease ichthyosis: congenital ichthyosiform erythroderma.

The Findlay family moved from Albury to a small village, Walla Walla, before she started preschool. Findlay attended Walla Walla Primary School and when she was 10 years old was diagnosed with a different form of ichthyosis, Netherton syndrome through genetic testing.

Findlay attended Murray High School in Albury and, during her final year, started working at a local Kmart department store. Findlay recalls feeling more comfortable with hospital staff than her fellow students.

Findlay studied at La Trobe University in Wodonga and in 2002 graduated with a Bachelor of eCommerce. She moved to Melbourne in 2003 to work for the Australian Public Service and completed her Masters of Communication from RMIT University from 2005 to 2012.

=== Career ===
From February 2003 to November 2017, Findlay was employed by the Australian Tax Department and from September 2016 to May 2017, held the position of Communication Coordinator for People with Disability Australia Inc.

In 2012 and 2013, Findlay had three encounters with taxi drivers which led her to make a complaint to the Victorian Taxi Commission and the Australian Human Rights Commission. The drivers in questions refused to transport Findlay, making comments on her appearance, alleged intoxication, and smell, and claiming she would damage their vehicle.

After the third incident, Findlay lodged a complaint with the taxi company, as did the hotel concierge who booked the taxi for her. When no action was taken, she complained to the Victorian Taxi Commission and the Australian Human Rights Commission.

Findlay has had a number of speaking gigs, both individually and as a part of event panels including Women of Letters, opening for Julia Gillard at Layne Beachley's Women in Leadership luncheon, Progress 2017, University of Western England, ProBlogger, Melbourne Writers Festival, Emerging Writers Festival, Dangerous Ideas around Disability and the Royal Melbourne Hospital. Findlay also regularly appears on podcasts and radio programs.

In 2017 Findlay appeared on the ABC television series You Can't Ask That and Cyber Hate with Tara Moss, and in 2018 she appeared on Channel Ten's The Project in response to an interview with Jon Faine on ABC Radio. On 28 March 2018, Findlay had appeared on ABC Radio's morning show to discuss microaggressions and disability. During the interview, the host Jon Faine described Findlay as looking like a “burns victim” and having a face that wouldn't “be good at Halloween”, before asking about her sex life.

Faine's line of questioning has been described by commentators and the public as “offensive”, “disrespectful” and “inappropriate”, while they described Findlay's reaction as “composed” and “polite”. Faine later apologised. The incident was later cited by former ABC boss Michelle Guthrie as causative to her being sacked by the ABC Board.

Findlay attributes most of her success to her appearance on You Can't Ask That.

In 2018, Findlay started promoting her upcoming book at a number of writers festivals across Australia, including the Feminist Writers Festival, Bendigo Writers Festival and at five events during the Melbourne Writers Festival, including a spoken word performance as part of the Quippings: Disability unleashed theatre group.

Findlay is access and inclusion coordinator for the Melbourne Fringe Festival one day a week, as well as providing customised disability awareness, social media and blogging training to organisations.

=== Access to Fashion ===
Findlay was unhappy with the lack of representation people with disabilities have in the media and fashion landscape. Propelled by her own experience of exclusion and elitism in fashion, in July 2018 she announced the first-ever disability-inclusive event to be held as part of Melbourne Fashion Week which was staged away from the main event.

"We're not treated the same when we go into stores. For me, I am sometimes not even spoken to. They think I am not going to want their clothes or their service, or they might be embarrassed to be seen with me,” Findlay said.

'Access to Fashion - Disability on the Runway: an Exploration of Disability Inclusion in the Fashion Industry' was held on 1 September 2018, and included a panel discussion as well as a runway show. It featured a number of models and fashion designers with disabilities.

== Writing ==
Findlay was a writer from a young age, and started her self-titled blog in 2009. Findlay's blog details events in her life, her experience of life with ichthyosis, and commentary as an appearance activist.

Findlay has written for a variety of online and traditional media, including the ABC, SBS, Sydney Morning Herald, The Guardian, The Age, Essential Baby, Kidspot, Ravishly, Frankie Magazine, and Mamamia. After a journalist described Findlay as an appearance activist, she claimed the title and has since written on a range of topics related to appearance diversity and disabilities in general. Her writing appears in anthologies - Growing Up African in Australia (edited by Maxine Beneba Clarke), Women of a Certain Rage, and Me Too - Stories from the Australian Movement, as well as in Bec Sparrow's Ask Me Anything and Tara Moss's Speaking Out. She was included in 200 women who will change the way you will see the world.

=== Representation ===
A common theme of Findlay's work is the importance of representation of people of diverse appearance in the media, fashion, and general life. She takes “back the [ableist] gaze through social media” and her blog, using them as a platform to promote her brand, her love of fashion, ableism and the treatment and pain she experiences in association with her condition.

Part of Findlay's push for representation is the need for disabled people to control how their stories are told, stopping disability being a tragedy or a burden to be overcome, and a push against so-called inspiration porn, a term coined by Stella Young.

Findlay's work examines the depiction of physical differences and disabilities in literature, advocating for personal agency and self-acceptance rather than medical normalization.

=== Privacy ===
Findlay's writing emphasises the right to privacy for both children and adults with disability. Findlay has said she is grateful to her parents for not sharing her story without her consent and has taken issue with individual parents and parenting groups who have “overshared” their children's stories. She explored this topic in one of her performances at the 2018 Melbourne Writers Festival.

=== Identity ===
For Findlay, disability is a more central aspect of her identity than her racial background and she embraces the term 'disabled person' rather than 'person with a disability'.

“Often when I write about disability and use the term 'disabled', people (strangers) correct me. They do so as they see disability as a bad thing ... Many disabled people see disability as part of our identity - just like race, sexuality, religion, gender etc. and that's ok. And many disabled people don't, and that's ok too. We can choose how to identify. And 'disabled' and 'disability' are not bad words.”

Findlay says that she did not identify as having a disability until her mid-twenties, but doing so has given her a platform on which to build her brand, a sense of confidence and a community.

=== Say Hello ===
Say Hello was published in 2019. Findlay wrote that "Say Hello will be the book I needed to read when I was younger. I didn't have any role models with my condition until I searched the internet in my teens. There were no memoirs on ichthyosis – only medical textbooks with people's faces blacked out." The book is a memoir of Findlay's life experience as a woman with ichthyosis as well as her journey to identifying as a disabled person and the struggles and confusion she experienced before reaching that point. Findlay hopes the book helps those who also have ichthyosis, their parents, young women and teachers.

"There was no one in media or books who looked like me, or to tell me it's ok to not want to change my appearance, and I didn't know whether I'd find love – love with another or love for myself. It's time to write that book. To be the person Little Carly needed."

=== Growing Up Disabled in Australia ===
Findlay edited Growing Up Disabled in Australia, part of Black Inc Books' 'Growing Up...' anthology series. It was released in 2021, and is the fifth book in the Growing Up series. It includes interviews with Australians such as Jordon Steele-John and Isis Holt, poetry and graphic art, and writing by people with a disability or chronic illness.

== Personal life ==
In June 2024, Findlay was diagnosed with ovarian and endometrial cancer, after having a hysterectomy to remove tumours. In January 2025, Findlay said on her blog that she is "cancer-free".

== Awards ==
Findlay was awarded the Order of Australia Medal in the 2020 Australia Day Honours for "service to people with a disability".

- 2010 Yooralla Media Awards - Best Online Commentary
- 2011 Australian Public Service Australia Day Award
- 2012 Layne Beachley Aim for the Stars grant
- 2013 Yooralla Media Awards - Best Online Commentary
- 2013 Kidspot Voices - Best Personal Blog
- 2013 BUPA Health Activist Award for Positive Life Change
- 2013 Writers Victoria Write-ability fellowship
- 2014 Australian Financial Review and Westpac Australia 100 Women of Influence Awards
- 2014 Participant in The Guardian's Diverse Writers Program
- 2016 Second place winner in the disability category of the Australian Centre for Women in Leadership
- 2019 shortlisted for The Horne Prize for the essay "In Sickness and In Health"
- 2019 joint recipient of the Lesley Hall Scholarship run by Arts Access Victoria
- 2021 recipient of Victoria Award for Excellence in Women's Leadership
- 2023 nominee in Marie Claire Australia's Woman of the Year Awards - Changemaker category
