= Glenroy, New South Wales =

Coordinates: 36.054°S 146.915°E

Glenroy
- Suburb
- Interactive map of Glenroy
- Country: Australia
- State: New South Wales
- City: Albury
- LGA: City of Albury

Government
  - State electorate: Albury
  - Federal division: Farrer

Population
  - Total: 2,659 (2006 census)
- Postcode: 2640
Suburbs around Glenroy
Splitters Creek	Hamilton Valley	Lavington
Splitters Creek	Glenroy	North Albury
Splitters Creek	West Albury	Central Albury

Glenroy is a suburb of the city of Albury, New South Wales, located northwest of the Albury Central Business District and west of Lavington. At the 2006 census, Glenroy had a population of 2659, although the area covered in the Census is considerably different from the actual area of the suburb.

Glenroy covers the northern slopes of Nail Can Hill on the Murray River floodplain, and is bordered by North Albury to the east, Hamilton Valley and Lavington to the north, Splitters Creek to the west and West Albury to the south. Glenroy is a developing residential area. Features include Nail Can Hill Reserve and Glenroy Public School.

== Geography ==
Glenroy is a developing residential suburb with large rural areas located in a valley on the northern slopes of Nail Can Hill. Nail Can Hill is of great ecological importance. Many bike and fire service trails have been built through Nail Can Hill, which is used for the annual Nail Can Hill Run. The native plant life includes the river red gum and red box eucalypts, which dominate. Nail Can Hill is home to a rare orchid species called the Crimson Spider Orchid, and is the only place in New South Wales where it can be found.

== Demographics ==
Glenroy is one of Albury's fastest-growing suburbs, with the Glenroy-Hamilton Valley area growing from 2004 in 1996 to 3120 in 2006, (a growth rate of 55.7% in 10 years). At the 2006 Census, the most common religion was Catholic, followed by Anglican, and the average weekly household income was $1121, above the Australian average of $1027. The median age was 34.

== Sports ==
Glen Park is home to the Boomers FC which is a soccer club based in Glenroy. They compete in the Albury Wodonga Football Association.
