= John Woodman Memorial =

John Woodman Memorial Wagga Wagga to Albury
Race details
- Date: August
- Region: New South Wales, Australia
- Nickname(s): Wagga to Albury
- Discipline: Road
- Competition: State Open
- Type: Road Handicap
- Organiser: Albury Wodonga Cycling Club

History
- First edition: 1987
- Editions: 25
- First winner: Bernard O'Dea (AUS)
- Most wins: Aaron Robertson (AUS) 2 wins
- Most recent: Rhys Pollock (AUS) (2012)

The John Woodman Memorial, otherwise known as the Wagga to Albury, is an annual bicycle handicap race that runs between the New South Wales cities of Wagga Wagga and Albury. The event was first run in the 1930s, leaving the Wagga Railway Station and travelling via Tarcutta and Holbrook to finish outside the Globe Hotel in Albury. In 1948 the race was changed to run via the Olympic Way and finish in Dean St. It ran this way until its conclusion in 1963. In 1987 the event was revived and has run every year since. The event is organised by the Albury Wodonga Cycling Club (AWCC) and for 2013, the race will be held on 28 July.

== History ==
The first Wagga to Albury was held in the 1930s. Leaving the Wagga Wagga railway station, the race travel east to Tarcutta, before travelling south through Holbrook to Albury, finish outside the Globe Hotel in Dean Street. In 1948 the race change to a shorter route via the Olympic Way to Albury. The last of the original races was held in 1963. Albury rider Jack Sommer won the fastest time.

The race was revived by then the Lavington Sports Club Cycling Club. The first of the modern additions of race was held on 4 June 1986, with 96 entries rolling out from the car park of Tolland Hotel. The first addition of the race was title Wagga to Albury Cycle Classic. It was rename the John Woodman Memorial Cycle Classic a year later. Today its official name John Woodman Memorial Wagga Wagga to Albury Cycle Classic, is generally just known as Wagga to Albury.

Today it remains of one of the few city to city handicap races on the open calendar.

In 2010 the Albury Wodonga Cycling Club made the decision to stopping running the race due to the financial costs and other factors. The decision was later reversed.

=== John Woodman ===
The race is named in honour of John Woodman, a talented Albury rider who turned professional in 1976, and 1986 join the Sydney base Gitane team. Winning a number of NSW and Victorian titles in his career, addition to riding in six Sun Tours. John was killed on 1 October 1986 whilst training for the upcoming Sun Tour.

== Course ==
Traditionally the race has started in front of the Tolland Hotel, Bourke Street, Wagga Wagga. In more recent times race has started from Jubilee Park on Holbrook Road due to traffic management issues. In 2010 the race started from Lloyd Road due to a clash with the Wagga Wagga Marathon, shortening the race by 3 kilometres (1.9 mi).

The race travels through Mangoplah, Cookardina, Morven, Culcairn, Walla Walla, Jindera, before cresting the Jindera Gap and descending down to finish in front of the Lavington Hall, Urana Road Lavington.

Total Length: 135 kilometres (84 mi)

In early years, the race finished in Albury's main street, Dean Street, in front of the Globe Hotel.

== Results ==
=== Major results ===
1977
1st and Fastest – Lavington Open
4th – Cootamundra Annual
2nd – NSW Professional Road Title
1978
1st – NSW Professional Road Title
8th – Melbourne to Warrnambool
1979
1st – Tour of the North East
2nd – NSW Professional Road Title
1st – Open Road Title
1st and Fastest – Bathurst to Penrith
1980
2nd – Tour of the North East
Fastest Time – Griffith 100km Open
Fastest Time – Wangaratta '90'
1981
1st and Fastest – Sid Demmery Memorial Wagga
2nd – NSW Professional Road Title
1983
2 stage wins in the Sun Tour
1986
3rd – NSW Professional Road Title
3rd – Midlands Tour

== Past winners ==
Year	Cyclist	Club/Location
2012	Rhys Pollock	Albury Wodonga CC
2011	Declan Gregory	Albury Wodonga CC
2010	Trent Stevenson	Shepparton CC
2009	William Lind	Canberra CC
2008	Michael Matthews	Tuggeranong Vikings CC
2007	Tim Decker	Bendigo & District CC
2006	Michael Tolhurst	Canberra CC
2005	Andrew Duggan	Sydney CC
2004	Karl McKenzies	Tasmania
2003	Richard Moffat	Wagga Wagga CC
2002	Rob Young	Lavington Sports CC
2001	Leigh Egan	Shepparton CC
2000	Brad Scott	Shepparton CC
1999	Ray Jarratt	Cobram CC
1998	Tim Palmer	Canberra CC
1997	Aaron Robertson	Wagga Wagga CC
1996	Aaron Robertson	Wagga Wagga CC
1995	Brendon Cooper	Cootamundra CC
1994	Jay Sweet	Adelaide CC
1993	Dean Woods	Wangaratta CC
1992	Peter Collins	Melbourne
1991	Scott Steward	
1990	Paul Evans	Bendigo CC
1989	Dean McDonald	Wangaratta CC
1988	John Holgate	Yarrawonga CC
1987	Bernard O'Dea	Bendigo CC

== Fastest Time ==
Year	Cyclist	Time	Club/Location
2012	Rhys Pollock	3:04:41	Albury Wodonga CC
2011	Leigh Egan	3:07:07	Shepparton CC
2010	Trent Stevenson	2:54:46	Shepparton CC
2009	Rhys Pollock	2:53:58	Albury Wodonga CC
2008	Michael Matthews	3:16:40	Tuggeranong Vikings CC
2007	Timothy Decker	3:10:39	Canberra CC
2006	Michael Matthews	3:14:17	Canberra CC
2005	Stephen Fitzpatrick	3:07:02	Sydney
2004	Karl Menzies	3:01:55	Tasmania
2003	Richard Moffat	Held at Chiltern – 99 km	Wagga Wagga CC
2002	Tim Decker	3:08:12	Bendigo & District CC
2001	Leigh Egan	3:02:08	Shepparton CC
2000	Leigh Egan	3:03:12	Shepparton CC
1999	Danny Hennessy	3:03:12	Canberra CC
1998	Peter Milostic	3:09:00	Penrith Panthers CC
1997	Jamie Drew	3:00:43	VIS
1996	Tim Bennett	2:57:19	Bendigo & District CC
1995	Brett Aitken	2:52:34	Adelaide
1994	Jay Sweet	2:42:12 Race Record	Adelaide
1993	Dean Woods	2:59:54	Wangaratta CC
1991	Peter Clayton	3:01:28	Sydney
1990	Scott Steward	3:01:28	Melbourne
1989	Dean McDonald	3:01:19	Wangaratta CC
1988	Rick McCaig	3:00:24	Bendigo & District CC
1987	Geoff Stevenson	3:04:21	Shepparton CC
1963	Jack Sommer		

== First Female ==
Year	Cyclist	Club/Location
2012	Lisa Barry	Albury Wodonga CC
2011	Trudi Beck	Albury Wodonga CC
2010	Kelly Linden	Wagga Wagga CC
2009	No female finishers.	
2008	Vicki Whitelaw	Canberra CC
2007	Deborah Fagg	Albury Wodonga CC

== First Local (AWCC) ==
Year	Male	Place	Female	Place
2012	Rhys Pollock	1st	Lisa Barry	–
2011	Declan Gregory	1st	Trudi Beck	–
2010	Brendan Washington	–	NA	–
2009	Brian Harris	4th	NA	–
2008	Daniel McIntyre	5th	NA	
2007	Greg Featonby	2nd	Deborah Fagg	
2005	Ken Payne	3rd	Deborah Fagg	5th
2001	Trent Perry	3rd		
