= West Albury, New South Wales =

West Albury
- Suburb
- Interactive map of West Albury
- Coordinates: 36°4′23″S 146°53′24″E
- Country: Australia
- State: New South Wales
- City: Albury
- LGA: City of Albury
- Location: 4 km (2.5 mi) from the Albury CBD; 23 km (14 mi) from Howlong

Government
  - State electorate: Albury
  - Federal division: Farrer

Area
  - Total: 8 km^{2} (3.1 sq mi)

Population
  - Total: 3,851 (2016 census)
  - Density: 481/km^{2} (1,250/sq mi)
- Postcode: 2640
Suburbs around West Albury
Splitters Creek	Glenroy	North Albury
Splitters Creek	West Albury	Central Albury
Wodonga (Vic)	Wodonga (Vic)	South Albury

West Albury is a suburb of the city of Albury, New South Wales, located 4 kilometres (2 mi) west of the Albury Central Business District. At the 2016 census, West Albury had a population of 3,851.

West Albury covers the slopes of Nail Can Hill on the Murray River floodplain, and is bordered by Central Albury to the east, Splitters Creek to the west, Glenroy to the north, and the Murray River and Victoria to the south. West Albury is mostly residential, and features include the Albury Wodonga Private Hospital, Padman Park and Albury West Public School.

== History ==
Like the rest of Albury, the area is part of traditional Wiradjuri country, and was known as Bungambrawatha. The first European settlement was in the late 19th century in Padman Park. The small (19 house) settlement were on mining licences for the Monument Hill quarry. Padman Park was cleared, the area on the river known as McKenzies flat was grazed and several fruit orchards were grown. The houses were eventually abandoned, the last one being bulldozed in the 1970s. At the same time, most of modern West Albury was partially cleared. Well after many of the other suburbs had been established, the area slowly began to be residentialised from the east. By the 1990s Pemberton Park, a housing estate on the east side of West Albury, was begun. The Private Hospital was built in 1979, at the time well away from the rest of the suburb. Albury West Public School and also been built by then, only taking around 100 students.

== Geography ==
West Albury is located on slopes between Nail Can Hill, Pemberton Hill, Monument Hill and the Murray River. The southern parts (Horseshoe Lagoon and Padman Park) are mostly wetlands and riparian bushland, and Nail Can Hill & Monument Hill are both dry bushland. Many bike trails have been built through Padman Park, Monument Hill, and Nail Can Hill (as part of the annual Nail Can Hill Run). Native plant life includes the river red gum and red box eucalypts, which dominate. Blackberry is a major problem in Horseshoe Lagoon/Padman Park, as are introduced grasses and other weeds. Nail Can Hill is home to a rare orchid species called the Crimson Spider Orchid, and is the only place in New South Wales where it can be found. On Monument Hill is the War Memorial, Albury's most visible landmark. The War Memorial was built at the end of Dean Street on Monument Hill on Anzac Day, 1925, and remains the most visible landmark in the city. It was designed by architect Louis Harrison. Monument Hill remains a nature reserve, linking to Nail Can Hill via the Roper Street Wildlife Corridor.

== Residents ==
At the 2016 Census, the population of West Albury was 3,851, a significant drop from 2006 when the population was 4115. The most common religion was no religion, followed by Catholic, and the average weekly household income was $1,138, below the Australian average of $1,438. The median age was 47 above the national average of 38.
