= East Albury, New South Wales =

Coordinates: 36.075°S 146.93°E

East Albury Albury, New South Wales
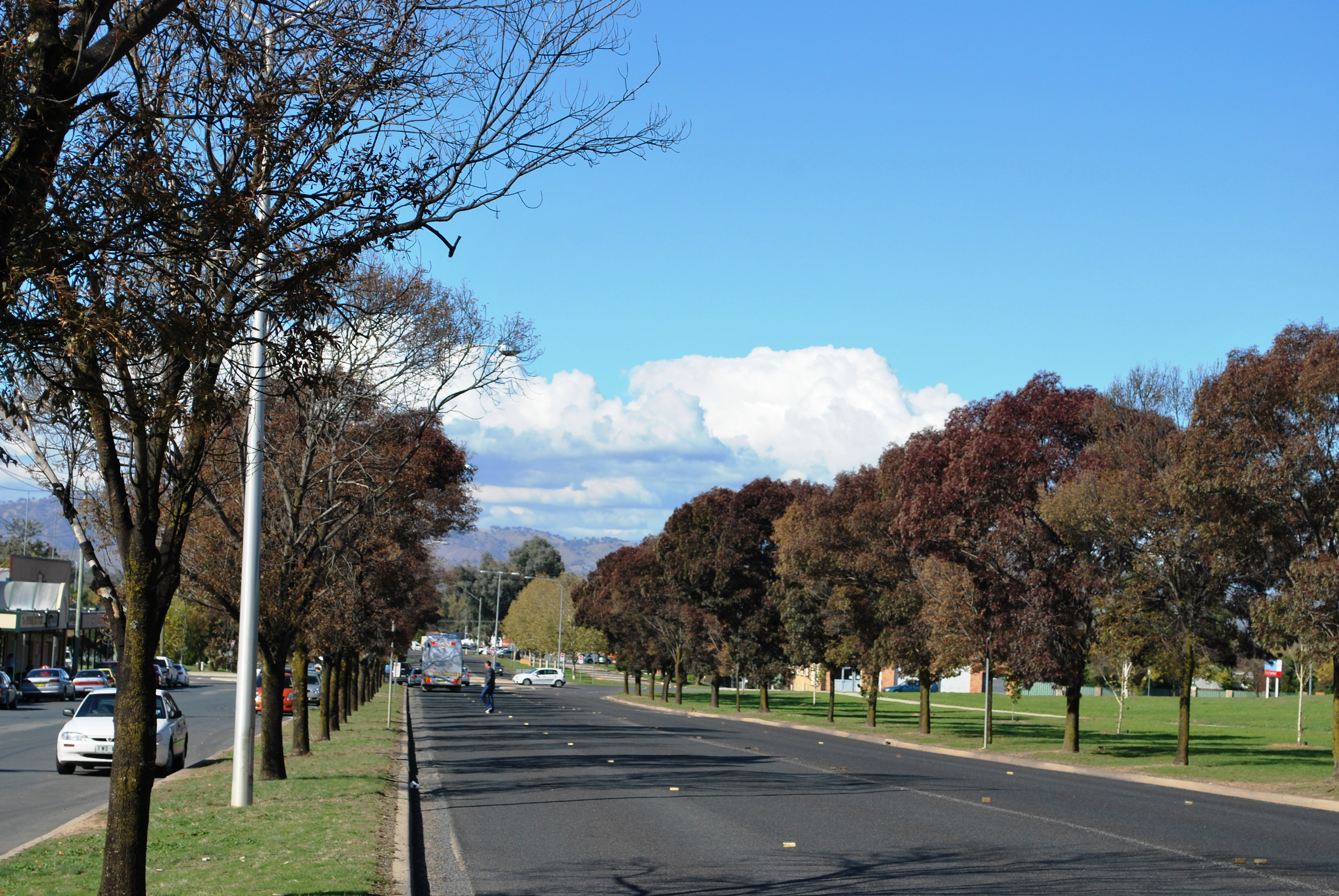
- Borella Rd, East Albury
- Population: 6,247 (2011 census)
  - Density: 507.9/km^{2} (1,315/sq mi)
- Area: 12.3 km^{2} (4.7 sq mi)
- Location: 3 km (2 mi) from the Albury CBD
- LGA(s): City of Albury
- State electorate(s): Albury
- Federal division(s): Farrer
Suburbs around East Albury:
North Albury	Lavington	Thurgoona
Central Albury	East Albury	Wirlinga
South Albury	Wodonga (Vic)	Wodonga (Vic)

East Albury is a suburb of the city of Albury, New South Wales, located 3 kilometres (2 mi) east of the Albury Central Business District. At the 2006 census, East Albury had a population of 5686.

East Albury lies on the eastern side of the railway/freeway line that runs through Albury. It covers Eastern Hill and the flat land around it on the Murray River floodplain, and is bordered by Albury to the west, Lavington and Thurgoona to the north, Wirlinga to the east, and Victoria to the south. East Albury is a residential & industrial area, and due to the freeway it is set to boom in the next few years. Already major commercial development has begun at the eastern fringe of the built-up part of the suburb. Features of the area include the Albury Base Hospital, Albury Airport, Albury Sports Stadium, Alexandra Park, Mungabareena Reserve and Eastern Hill.

== History ==
Development of the area dates from the 1830s, with growth in the 1850s and 1870s due to improvements in access and transport. Most growth has occurred in the post-war years, due to the formation of an Albury-Wodonga national growth centre under the Whitlam government.

== Geography ==
East Albury is bound to the north by North Street and Fallon Street, to the east by Dallinger Road, to the south by the Murray River and to the west by the railway/freeway line. The built-up residential part of East Albury lies on the slopes of Eastern Hill. Flat cleared land to the north and east is used partly for the city's airport. Eastern Hill is a natural reserve, as is Mungabareena Reserve, a wetland area on the Murray River south of the airport and Eastern Hill. Mungabareena also has significant Aboriginal importance.

== Residents ==
At the 2011 Census, the population of East Albury was 6,247. The most common religion was Catholic, followed by Anglican, and the average household income was $1,141, below the Australian average of $1,234. The median age was 37.

== Sports ==
St. Pats Soccer Club is based at Alexandra Park and compete in the Albury Wodonga Football Association.

The Lauren Jackson Stadium is located in East Albury. The stadium is named in honour of WNBA, Olympic and international basketball player Lauren Jackson, who grew up in Albury. The stadium is the home court for the Albury Wodonga Bandits, who play in the NBL1 league.
