= Splitters Creek, New South Wales =

Coordinates: 36.06°S 146.84°E

Splitters Creek
- Suburb
- Interactive map of Splitters Creek
- Country: Australia
- State: New South Wales
- City: Albury
- LGA: City of Albury

Government
  - State electorate: Albury
  - Federal division: Farrer

Area
  - Total: 31 km^{2} (12 sq mi)

Population
  - Total: 312 (SAL 2021)
Suburbs around Splitters Creek
Greater Hume Shire	Jindera, Greater Hume Shire	Hamilton Valley
Bungowannah, Greater Hume Shire	Splitters Creek	Glenroy
Wodonga (Vic)	Wodonga (Vic)	West Albury

Splitters Creek is a suburb of the city of Albury, New South Wales, located west of the Albury Central Business District.

As its name suggests, Splitters Creek lies in the Splitters Creek valley in the hills of Nail Can Hill/Black Range on the Murray River floodplain. It is bordered by West Albury, Glenroy and Hamilton Valley to the east, the Greater Hume Shire (including Jindera and Bungowannah) to the north and west, and Victoria to the south.

Splitters Creek is a rural area, with most of the population centred on Splitters Creek and Bretton Roads, as well as along the Riverina Highway. Much of the area is uninhabited bushland. Features of the area include the Wonga Wetlands, Aquatic Environment and Education Centre and the Wiradjuri Cultural Centre. There is a Community Centre complex on the Altmeier-Ortlipp Reserve which is also the location of the Splitters Creek Rural Fire Brigade, part on the NSW Rural Fire Service.

The Splitters Creek valley is classed as a very high fire risk by the NSW Rural Fire Service (one of two in NSW) due to the topography and the access with only 1 road in and out.

== Splitters Creek Rural Fire Brigade ==
The brigade is very active and is made up of community members who volunteer their time to protect their community from the dangers of fire. It also educates community members about the dangers of fire and being fire ready.

The brigade currently has a category 7 light bushfire tanker which is great for the rocky and hilly terrain the brigade often has to work in. The largest of the fleet is a category 1 Isuzu heavy bushfire tanker, Setup for structural, MVA as well as bushfires with its large carrying capacity. The brigade also has a category 9 Toyota Land Cruiser striker which helps the brigade lower response times and gives them the agility they require around the hilly brigade area.

They are part of the New South Wales Rural Fire Service, Southern Border Team which extends from Finley in the west to Jingellic in the East and is bordered by the Murray River to the south.

The brigade attends a number of incidents from bush, structure & motor vehicle fires, to motor vehicle accidents (MVA's), flooding & storm damage both in Splitters Creek and out of area where required.

== Geography ==
Splitters Creek is surrounded by the hills and floodplain of the Murray River. One of the major features is the Wonga Wetlands, a wetland area in the south-east of Splitters Creek. Wonga is noted for its diversity, and has been used for many aquatic studies (this is where the Aquatic Environment and Education Centre is located).
