= Springdale Heights, New South Wales =

Coordinates: 36.033°S 146.95°E

Springdale Heights Albury, New South Wales
- Population: 2,036 (2016 census)
- LGA(s): City of Albury
- State electorate(s): Albury
- Federal division(s): Farrer
Suburbs around Springdale Heights:
Table Top/Ettamogah	Table Top/Ettamogah	Table Top/Ettamogah
Table Top/Ettamogah	Springdale Heights	Table Top/Ettamogah
Lavington	Lavington	Thurgoona

Springdale Heights is a suburb of the city of Albury, New South Wales, located north of the Albury Central Business District and north of Lavington At the 2006 census, Springdale Heights had a population of 1761, although the area covered in the Census includes parts of Table Top.

Springdale Heights is at the northern edge of urban Albury, on the slopes of the Black Range. It is surrounded by Table Top/Ettamogah to the north, and Lavington & Thurgoona to the south. Springdale Heights includes a school.

== Geography ==
Springdale Heights is a developing residential suburb located on the slopes of the Black Range north of Albury. It is bound by Kaitlers Road to the south, the freeway/railway to the east, and Table Top/Ettamogah to the north and west.

== Residents ==
At the 2006 census, the population of Springdale Heights was 1761, but the census area also covered parts of Table Top.

The most common religion was Catholic, followed by Anglican, and the average household income was $924, below the Australian average of $1027. The median age was 30.
