= Table Top, New South Wales =

Table Top
- Region
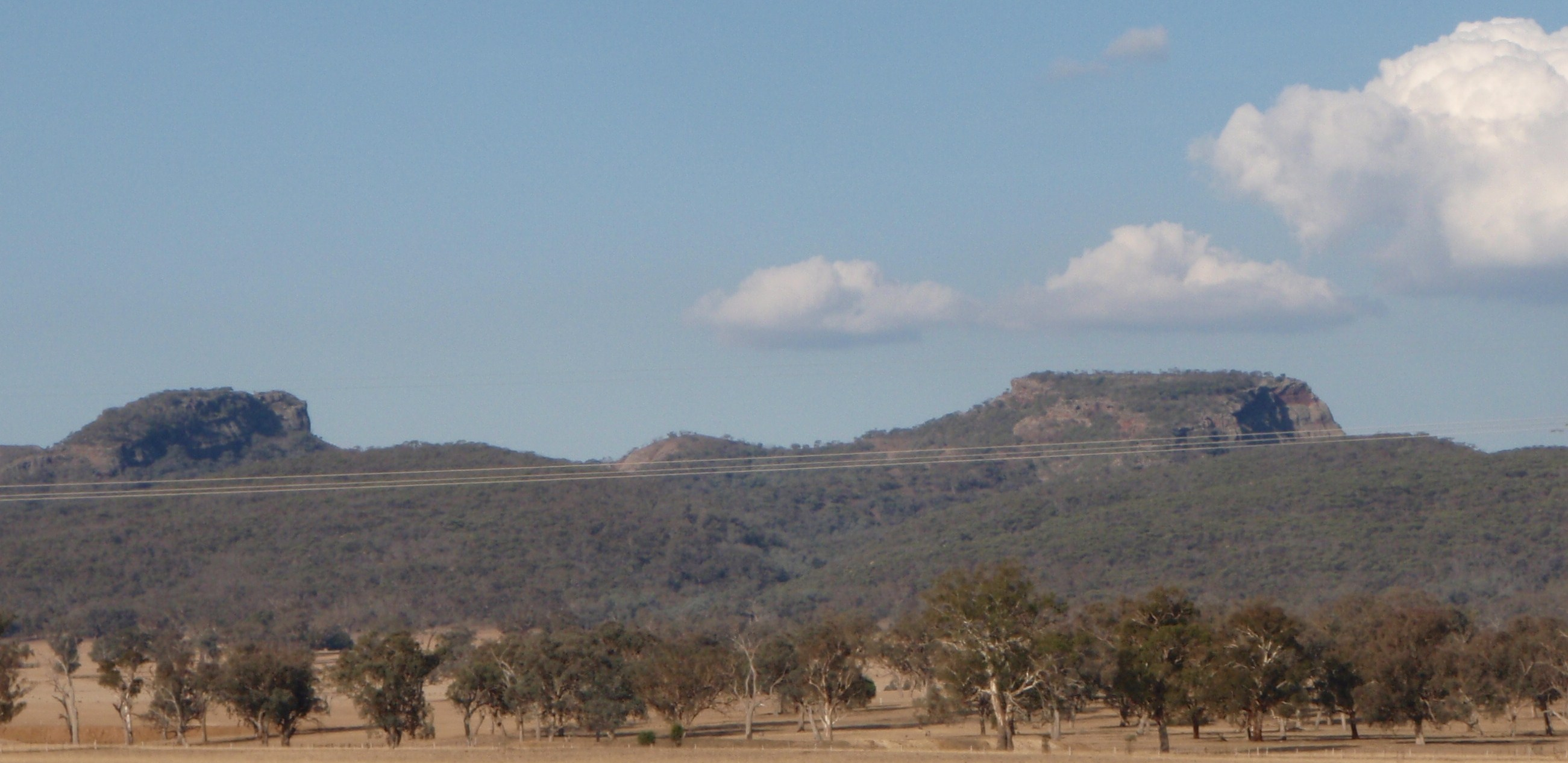
- Table Top Mountain

- Interactive map of Table Top
- Coordinates: 35°58′0″S 147°0′0″E
- Country: Australia
- State: New South Wales
- City: Albury
- LGA: City of Albury
- Location: 16 km (9.9 mi) from Albury; 16 km (9.9 mi) from Bowna

Government
  - State electorate: Albury
  - Federal division: Farrer

Population
  - Total: 1,516 (2021 census)
- Postcode: 2640
Regions around Table Top
Gerogery, New South Wales	Greater Hume Shire	Mullengandra, New South Wales
Jindera, Greater Hume Shire	Table Top
Springdale Heights	Thurgoona,Wirlinga	Bowna, New South Wales

Table Top village is an outer suburb of the city of Albury, New South Wales, located 16 kilometres (10 mi) north of Albury and 16 kilometres (10 mi) west of Bowna. At the 2021 census, Table Top had a population of 1,516. The area used to be part of the Hume Shire until 2004 when, following council amalgamations, it was integrated into the City of Albury.

Table Top region is located in the flat area north of Albury, bounded by the Greater Hume Shire, Jindera, to the west, and the suburbs of Hamilton Valley, Springdale Heights, Thurgoona and Wirlinga to the south.

== History ==
Yambla Post Office opened on 1 April 1886, was renamed Table Top in 1895 and closed in 1968.

== Today ==
Table Top is a rural and agricultural area, with a large part of the population living in an area around the former Norske Skog Paper Mill. Features of the area include the original Ettamogah Pub (based on a cartoon pub by Ken Maynard that was featured in the now defunct Australasian Post magazine), the Ettamogah Wildlife Sanctuary (later called Oze Wildlife; now closed), several wineries and Table Top Public School.

== Geography ==
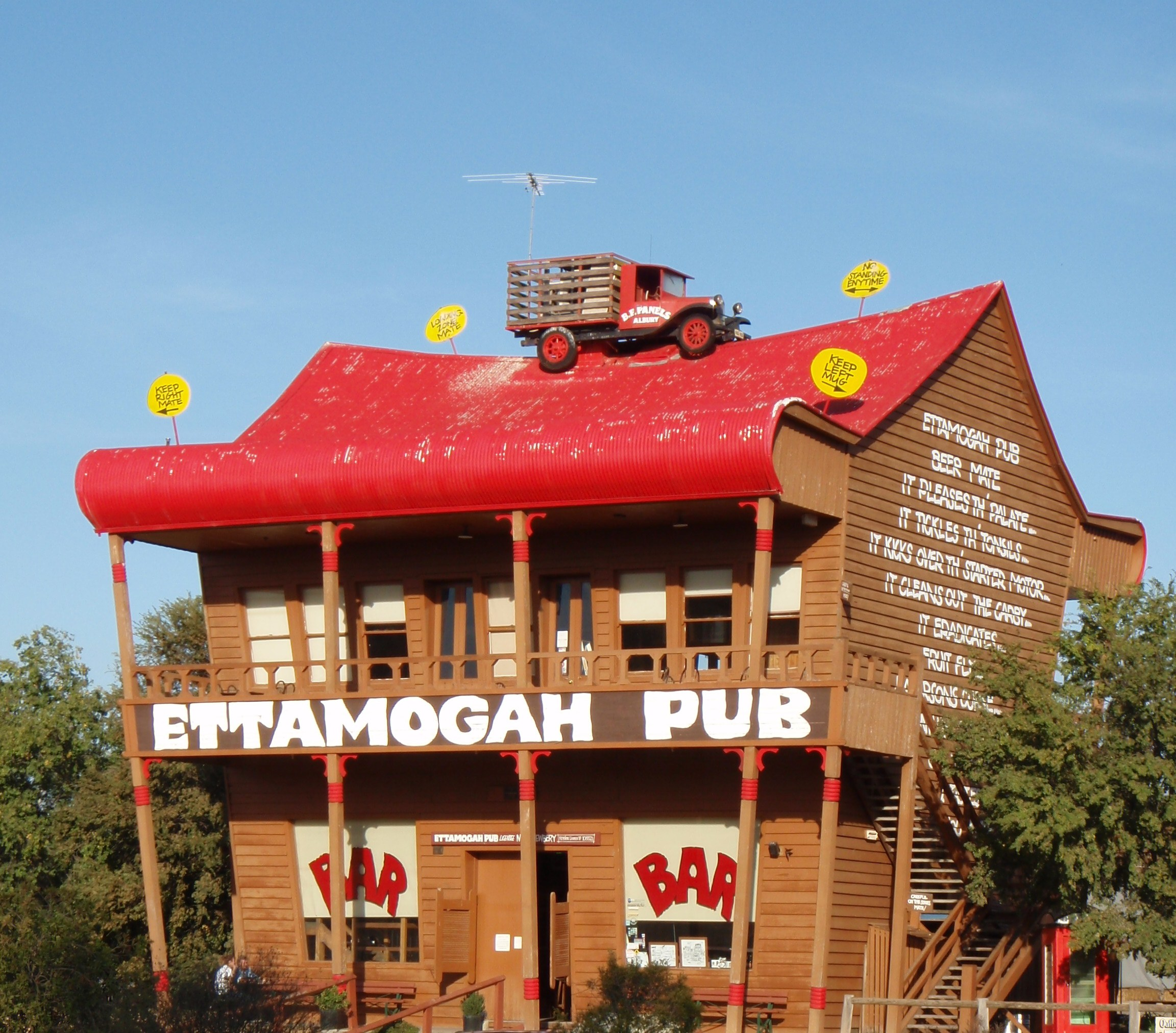
The original Ettamogah Pub

The Table Top area is mostly flat, but includes part of the Yambla Range in the north. Part of the area is the Bowna arm of Lake Hume.

== Residents ==
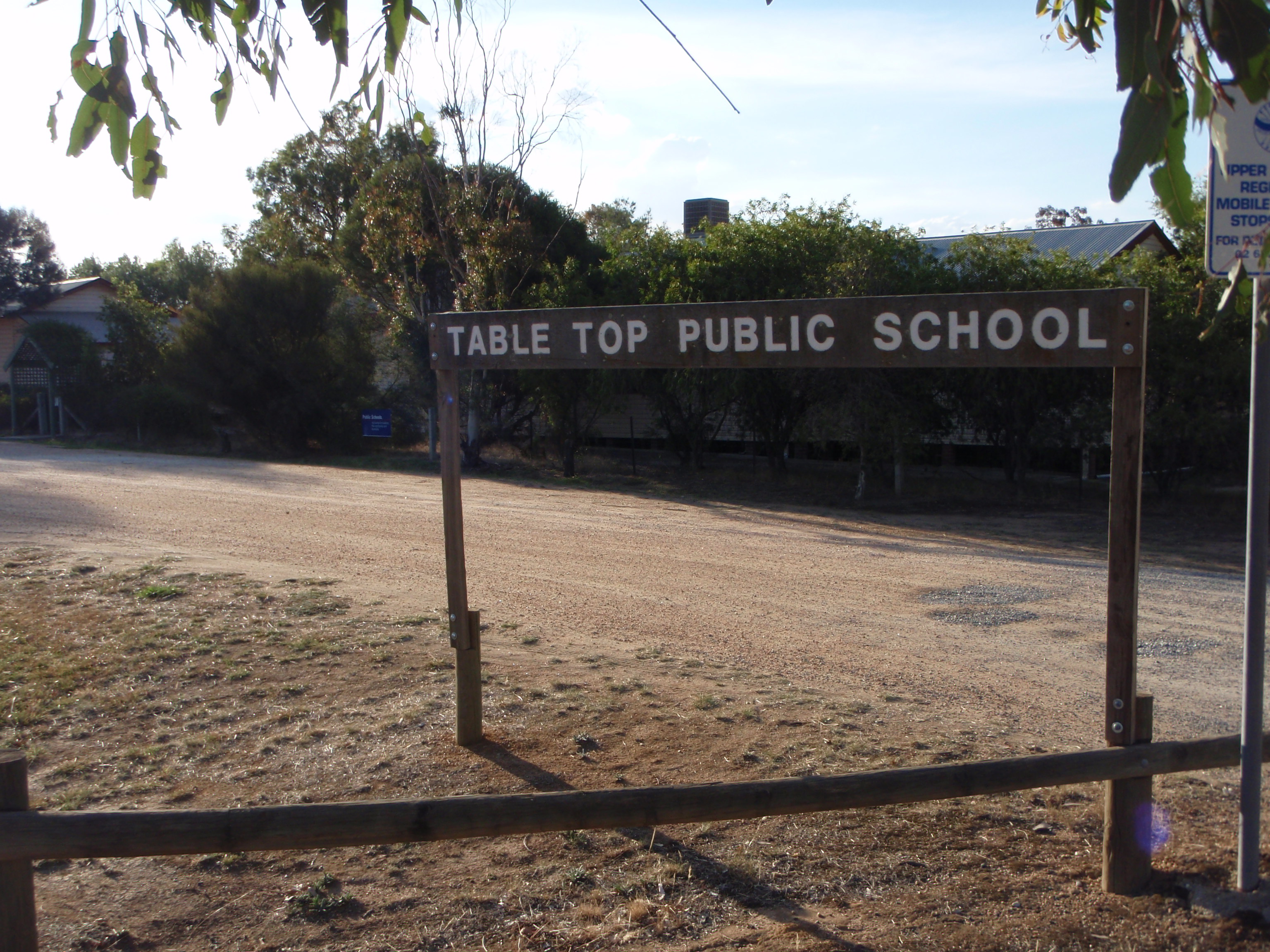
Table Top Public School

In the 2021 census, the population of Table Top was 1,516. The most common religion was Catholic, followed by Anglican, and the median weekly household income was $2,475, above the NSW average of $1,829. The median age was 42.
