= South Albury, New South Wales =

Coordinates: 36.093°S 146.915°E

South Albury Albury, New South Wales
- Population: 1,102 (2006 census)
  - Density: 184/km^{2} (480/sq mi)
- Area: 6 km^{2} (2.3 sq mi)
- Location: 3 km (2 mi) from the Albury CBD
- LGA(s): City of Albury
- State electorate(s): Albury
- Federal division(s): Farrer
Suburbs around South Albury:
West Albury	Central Albury	East Albury
Wodonga (Vic)	South Albury	Wodonga (Vic)
Wodonga (Vic)	Wodonga (Vic)	Wodonga (Vic)

South Albury is a suburb of the city of Albury, New South Wales, located 3 kilometres (2 mi) south of the Albury Central Business District. At the 2006 census, South Albury had a population of 1102.

South Albury is a mixed use area, including residential, commercial and industrial. It is bounded by Central Albury, West Albury and East Albury to the north, and Wodonga (Victoria) to the south. South Albury was extremely prone to flooding but mitigation works in the 1990s have dramatically reduced the risk.

== Geography ==
South Albury is completely within the floodplain of the Murray River, and is bound by the Hume Highway/Hume Street to the north, the railway/freeway line to the east, Wodonga Place to the west and the Murray River to the south. The built-up part of the suburb includes residential and commercial/industrial areas.

== Residents ==
The 2006 population of 1102 did not include those south of the railway line. The most common religion was Catholic, followed by Anglican, and the median household income was $699 per week, below the Australian average of $1027 per week. The median age was 37.

== Sport ==
Aloysius Park in South Albury is home to the Albury Hotspurs Soccer Club. They compete in the Albury Wodonga Soccer Association.

South Albury Football Club

The South Albury Football Club was an Australian Rules club that originally competed in the Albury & Border Junior Football Association in the early 1930s and they won the 1938 premiership, defeating East Albury.

South Albury FC competed in the Chiltern & District Football Association between 1949 and 1952.

South Albury FC then merged with the Albury Football Club when the Ovens & Murray Football League Reserves competition commenced in 1953.

South Albury FC was reformed in 1977 as a stand-alone club and entered a team in the Tallangatta & District Football League, but they went into recess after the 1981 season.

Former North Albury Football Club and Albury Football Club player, Tony Heather was captain-coach and he won the 1978 Tallangatta & District Football League best and fairest award, the Barton Medal.

== Links ==
- 1950 – South Albury FC team photo
