= Thurgoona, New South Wales =

Thurgoona
- Suburb
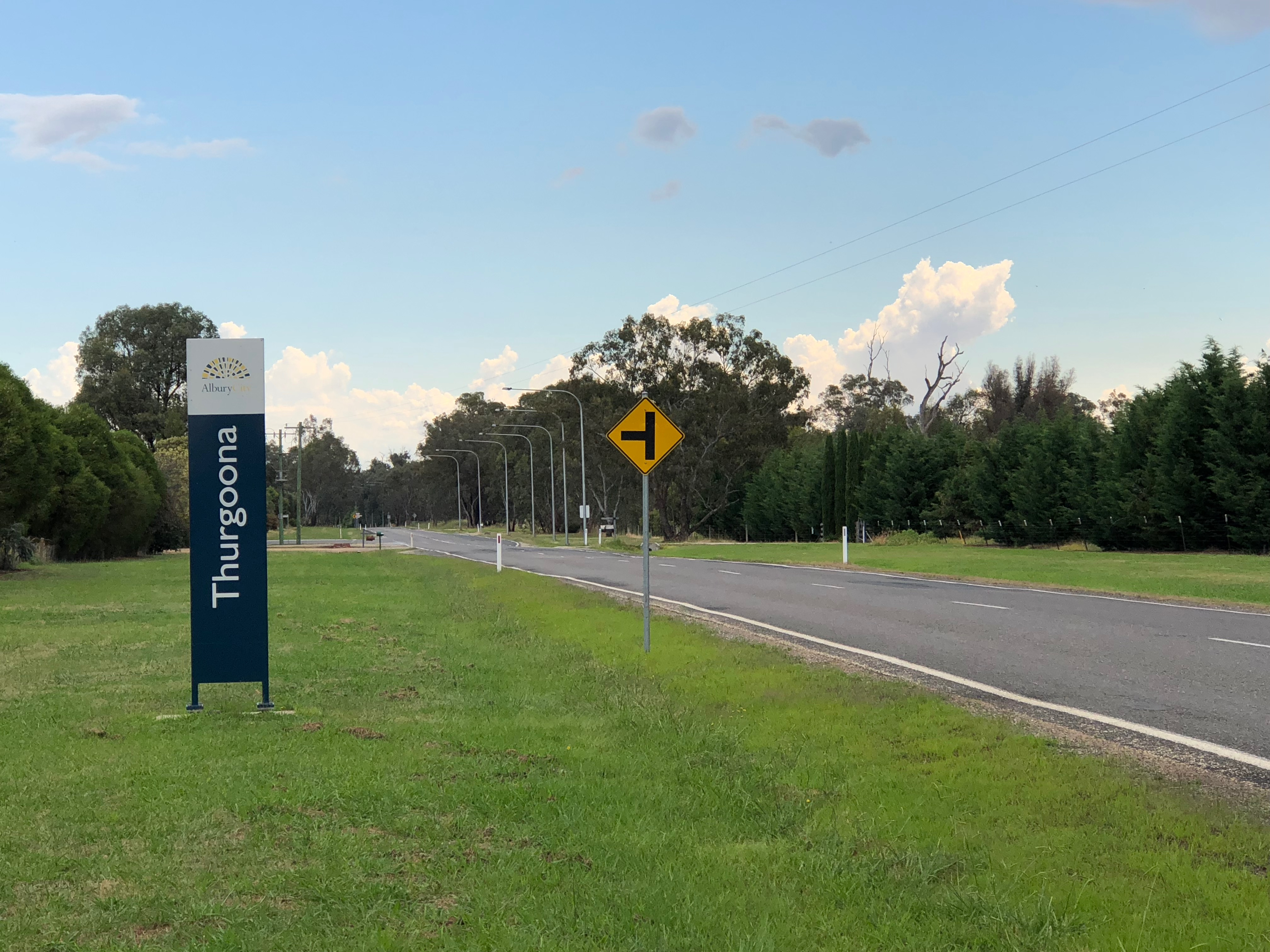
- Thurgoona northern entrance.
- Interactive map of Thurgoona
- Country: Australia
- State: New South Wales
- City: Albury
- LGA: City of Albury

Government
  - State electorate: Albury
  - Federal division: Farrer

Population
  - Total: 11,028 (2021 census)
- Postcode: 2640
Suburbs around Thurgoona
Springdale Heights	Table Top/Ettamogah	Bowna
Lavington	Thurgoona	Wirlinga
East Albury		Lake Hume

Thurgoona is an outer suburb of the regional city of Albury in southern New South Wales, Australia. The suburb is located in the City of Albury local government area.

== History ==
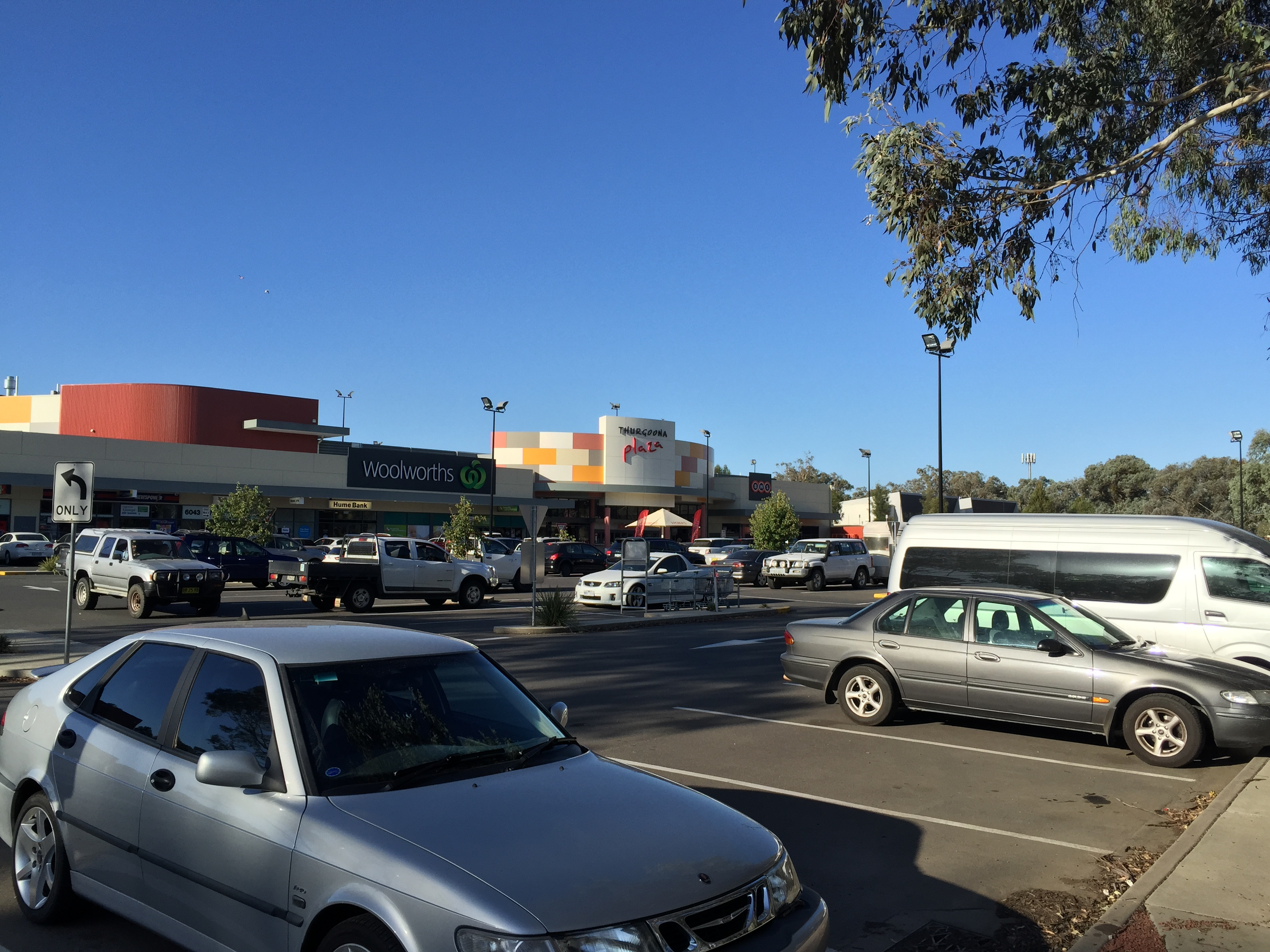
Thurgoona Plaza

Thurgoona Post Office opened on 1 January 1874, closing in 1961.

The first land release in Thurgoona was St Johns Hill in 1978, followed by St Jones Green in 1980, Corrys Wood in 1981, St Hilaire in 1985 and Thurgoona Park in 1986. The 1980s were a time of massive growth and development in Thurgoona. Thurgoona Drive and Elizabeth Mitchell Drive were completed by 1982, connecting Thurgoona to Albury via the Hume and Riverina Highways. Soon after the Thurgoona Golf Club opened its first 9 holes in 1983, followed by a further 9 holes in 1985. In 1986 the Albury-Wodonga Corporation moved its headquarters to Thurgoona. By 1989, a hotel had opened at the golf course, a new shopping centre was under construction, Thurgoona Public School opened and the Thurgoona Industrial Park opened near the Albury Airport.

In March 2010 Thurgoona saw the opening of a new Thurgoona Plaza, with Woolworths, a Hume Bank branch and many other new shops. New shops include a tandoori restaurant, hairdressing salon, pizza shop, pharmacy, butcher, bakery, two cafés and a Thai takeaway restaurant.

In late 2015, a local resident took a photograph of a giant goanna scaling the wall of his house. The photograph was featured in national media

== Education ==
Thurgoona's schools include Thurgoona Public School (est.1862), Border Christian College and Trinity Anglican College.

The NSW TAFE Environmental Centre (NEC) is located in Thurgoona. It is one of TAFE's headquarters for specialist training in Civil Construction, Natural Resource Management, Spatial Information (GIS), Water Operations, Permaculture, Organic Farming, environmentally related studies and sustainable agriculture.

Charles Sturt University purchased land at Thurgoona in 1993 from the Albury-Wodonga Development Corporation to the value of $6 million. Then in April 1997 construction began on the new Thurgoona campus. Originally, it was established as a secondary campus to the Albury campus, however by 2010 that campus closed and the Thurgoona campus had been developed into their sole Albury campus. During late 2010, a new dentistry and oral health campus were completed behind the Thurgoona Plaza.

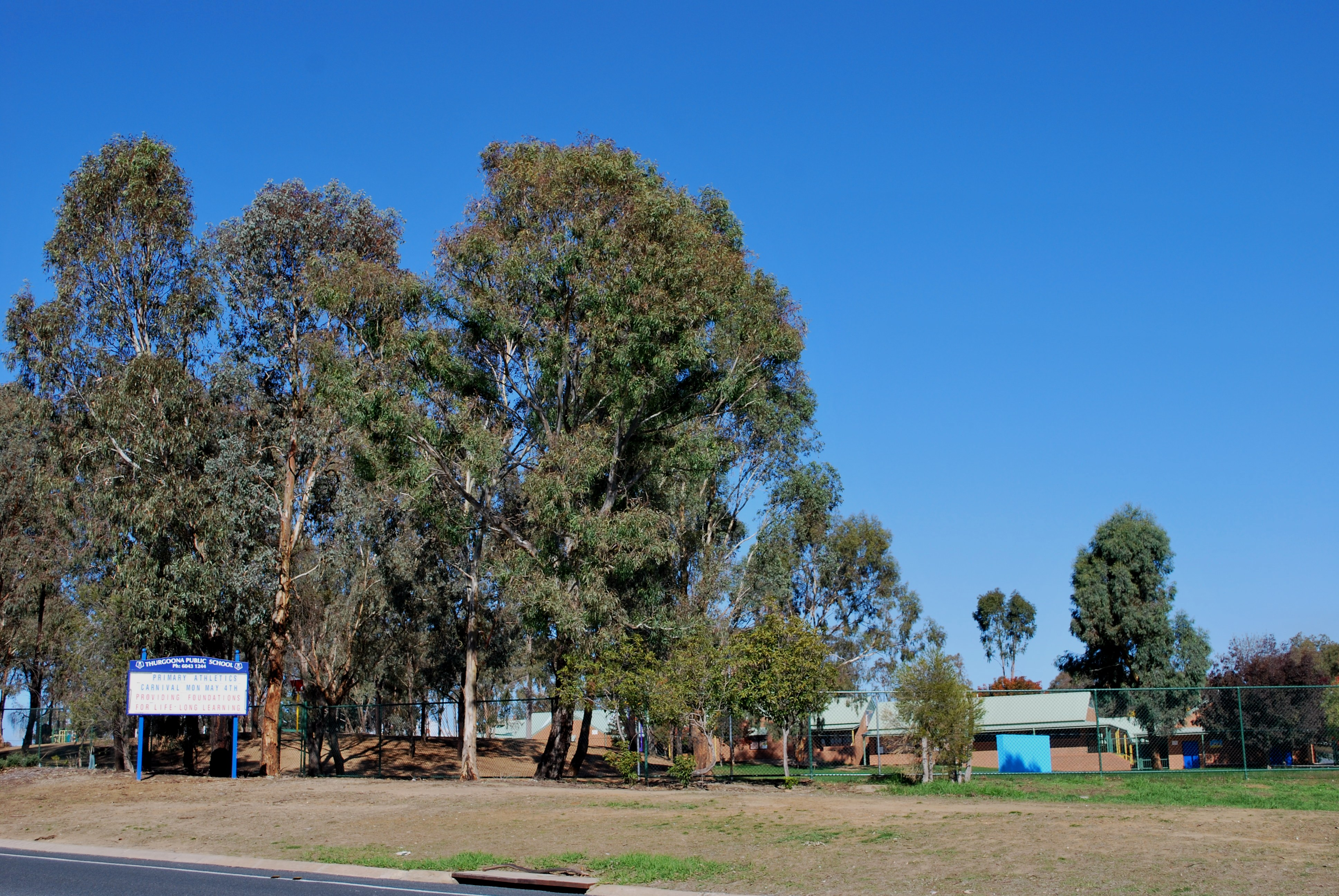
Thurgoona Public School

== Sport ==
The suburb has an Australian Rules football team competing in the Tallangatta & District Football League, a league based mainly in Victoria.

== Geography ==
Thurgoona is located to the east of the Hume Freeway and to the north-east of the Albury CBD.

Thurgoona is known for a relatively large network of Box Gum Grassy Woodlands that used to cover most of the New South Wales Southern Slopes. The nature corridors within Thurgoona maintained and developed by the local community and the former Albury-Wodonga Development Corporation in the 1980s and 1990s, has allowed habitats to sustain local wildlife.

While the area is home to over 100 species of birds, it is also home to many threatened species. These include Sloane’s Froglet, regent honeyeater, and the squirrel glider (Petaurus norfolcensis). Squirrel gliders are listed as threatened in NSW and Thurgoona is home to a significant population of the arboreal (tree-dwelling) mammal.

=== Climate ===
Climate data for Thurgoona (Lat: 36.05° S, Lon: 146.98° E) (precipitation normals 1887-1913)
Month	Jan	Feb	Mar	Apr	May	Jun	Jul	Aug	Sep	Oct	Nov	Dec	Year
Average precipitation mm (inches)	44.8 (1.76)	44.2 (1.74)	56.5 (2.22)	42.7 (1.68)	62.6 (2.46)	98.1 (3.86)	73.5 (2.89)	64.7 (2.55)	59.1 (2.33)	58.2 (2.29)	59.3 (2.33)	46.9 (1.85)	710.6 (27.96)
Source: Bureau of Meteorology

== Residents ==
At the 2021 Census, the population of Thurgoona was 11,028. The most common religion was no religion, followed by Catholic and Anglican. The median weekly household income was $1,953, above the Australian median of $1,770. The median age was 34, below the national median of 39.
