= City of Albury =

- Local government area
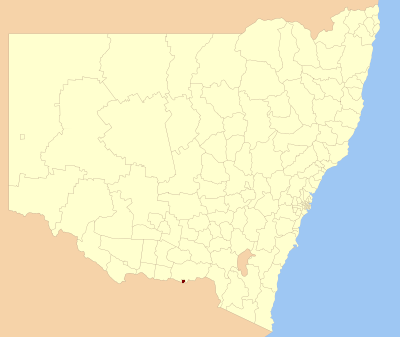
- Location in New South Wales

- Interactive map of City of Albury
- Coordinates: 36°03′S 146°57′E
- Country: Australia
- State: New South Wales
- Region: Riverina
- Established: 1859; 1946 (as a city)
- Council seat: Albury

Government
  - Mayor: Kylie King (Independent)
  - State electorate: Albury
  - Federal division: Farrer

Area
  - Total: 305.9 km^{2} (118.1 sq mi)

Population
  - Total: 53,767 (2018)
  - Density: 175.767/km^{2} (455.23/sq mi)
- Website: City of Albury
LGAs around City of Albury
Greater Hume	Greater Hume	Greater Hume
Greater Hume	City of Albury	Greater Hume
Wodonga (Vic)	Wodonga (Vic)	Wodonga (Vic)

The City of Albury (stylised as AlburyCity) is a local government area in the Riverina region of New South Wales, Australia. The area covers 305.9 square kilometres (118.1 sq mi) to the north of the Murray River. The area extends around 10 to 12 kilometres (6.2 to 7.5 mi) east and west along the river from the centre of Albury and up to 20 kilometres (12 mi) north. The population of the City of Albury area was 53,767 in June 2018.

Albury is located 460 kilometres (290 mi) to the south–west of Sydney and 260 kilometres (160 mi) to the north–east of Melbourne. The national Hume Highway passes through the area. Other major road transport links include the Riverina Highway that commences east of Albury and runs west to Deniliquin; and north of Albury, the Olympic Highway connects Albury with Cowra. The city forms a major crossing point of the Murray River and also the railway junction of the Main Southern line with the North East line.

Albury was declared a municipality in 1859 and proclaimed a city in 1946.

The mayor of Albury is Kylie King, an independent councillor.

== Suburbs within the local government area ==
Suburbs within the City of Albury are:

- Albury
- East Albury
- Ettamogah
- Glenroy
- Hamilton Valley
- Lavington
- Lake Hume Village
- North Albury
- South Albury
- Splitters Creek
- Springdale Heights
- Table Top
- Thurgoona
- West Albury
- Wirlinga

== Demographics ==
At the 2021 Census, there were 56,093 people in the Albury local government area, of these 48.3% were male and 51.7% were female. Aboriginal and Torres Strait Islander people made up 3.8% of the population. The median age of people in the City of Albury area was 39 years. Children aged 0 – 14 years made up 18.9% of the population and people aged 65 years and over made up 19.6% of the population. Of people in the area aged 15 years and over, 43.8% were married and 13.8% were either divorced or separated.

Population growth in the City of Albury Council area between the 2001 Census and the 2006 Census was 9.38%; and in the subsequent five years to the 2011 Census was 3.30%. When compared with total population growth of Australia for the same periods, being 5.78% and 8.32% respectively, population growth in the Albury local government area was generally on par with the national average. The median weekly income for residents within the City of Albury area was slightly below the national average.

At the 2011 Census, the proportion of residents in the Albury local government area who stated their ancestry as Australian or Anglo-Celtic exceeded 77% of all residents (national average was 65.2%). In excess of 58% of all residents in the City of Albury area nominated a religious affiliation with Christianity at the 2011 Census, which was slightly higher than the national average of 50.2%. Meanwhile, as at the Census date, compared to the national average, households in the Albury local government area had a significantly lower than average proportion (6.8%) where two or more languages are spoken (national average was 20.4%); and a significantly higher proportion (90.4%) where English only was spoken at home (national average was 76.8%).

Selected historical census data for Albury local government area
Census year		2001	2006	2011	2016
Population	Estimated residents on census night	42,314	▲46,282	▲47,810	▲51,076
Population	LGA rank in terms of size within New South Wales			45th	▲44th
Population	% of New South Wales population			0.69%	▼0.68%
Population	% of Australian population	0.23%	0.23%	▼0.22%	0.22%
Cultural and language diversity					
Ancestry, top responses	English			29.3%	▼28.8%
Ancestry, top responses	Australian			30.4%	▼28.5%
Ancestry, top responses	Irish			10.0%	▲10.2%
Ancestry, top responses	Scottish			7.8%	▲8.1%
Ancestry, top responses	German			5.8%	▼5.5%
Language, top responses (other than English)	Nepali	n/c	n/c	▲0.5%	▲1.0%
Language, top responses (other than English)	Punjabi	n/c	n/c	n/c	▲0.5%
Language, top responses (other than English)	Mandarin	n/c	n/c	n/c	▲0.3%
Language, top responses (other than English)	Greek	0.4%	0.4%	0.4%	▼0.3%
Language, top responses (other than English)	Hindi	n/c	n/c	▲0.2%	▲0.3%
Religious affiliation					
Religious affiliation, top responses	No Religion	12.5%	▲16.4%	▲19.9%	▲27.5%
Religious affiliation, top responses	Catholic	29.0%	▼28.9%	▼28.4%	▼25.6%
Religious affiliation, top responses	Anglican	24.3%	▼22.4%	▼20.4%	▼16.9%
Religious affiliation, top responses	Not Stated	n/c	n/c	n/c	▲9.2%
Religious affiliation, top responses	Uniting Church	7.2%	▼6.3%	▼5.5%	▼4.2%
Median weekly incomes					
Personal income	Median weekly personal income		A$452	A$558	A$642
Personal income	% of Australian median income		97.0%	▼96.7%	▲97.0%
Family income	Median weekly family income		A$919	A$1,360	A$1,532
Family income	% of Australian median income		89.5%	▲91.8%	▼88.4%
Household income	Median weekly household income		A$1,137	A$1,025	A$1,185
Household income	% of Australian median income		97.1%	▼83.1%	▼82.4%

== Council ==
=== Current composition and election method ===
Albury City Council is composed of nine councillors elected proportionally as a single ward. All councillors are elected for a fixed four-year term of office. The mayor is elected by the councillors at the first meeting of the council. The most recent election was held on 14 September 2024, and the makeup of the council is as follows:

Party	Councillors
Independents	7
Team Mack	3
Stuart Baker Team	1
Team Kylie	1
Alice Glachan's Team	1
Jessica Kellahan Team	1
Australian Labor Party	1
The Greens	1
Total	9

The current Council, elected in 2024, in order of election, is:

Councillor	Party	Notes
Kevin Mack	Team Mack	
Stuart Baker	Stuart Baker Team	
Kylie King	Team Kylie	Mayor
Jessica Kellahan	Jessica Kellahan Team	
Raissa Butkowski	Team Mack	
Phillip Bullivant	Team Mack	
Darren Cameron	Australian Labor Party	
Geoff Hudson	Greens	
Alice Glachan	Alice Glachan's Team	

== Election results ==
=== 2024 ===
2024 Albury City Council election: Results summary
Party	Votes	%	Swing	Seats	Change
Team Mack	9,415	31.1		3	
Team Kylie	4,769	15.7	−6.9	1	
Jessica Kellahan Team	4,011	13.2		1	
Stuart Baker Team	3,584	11.8	−5.3	1	
Greens	2,898	9.6	−1.2	1	
Alice Glachan's Team	2,476	8.2	−5.8	1	
Labor	2,160	7.1	−2.4	1	
Independent Liberal	997	3.3		0	
Formal votes	30,310	93.6			
Informal votes	2,084	6.4			
Total	32,394	100.0		9	
Registered voters / turnout	40,701	79.6			

=== 2021 ===
2021 New South Wales local elections: Albury
Party	Candidate	Votes	%	±%
Team Kylie	1. Kylie King (elected); 2. Steve Bowen (elected); 3. Rhiannon Veness; 4. Aimee Chan; 5. Taneesha Smith	6,426	22.6	+22.6
Stuart Baker Team	1. Stuart Baker (elected); 2. Jessica Kellahan (elected); 3. Stephen Mamouney; 4. Danielle Cale; 5. Louise Pemberton	4,863	17.1	+17.1
Alice Glachan Ticket	1. Alice Glachan (Ind. Lib) (elected); 2. Lindsay Pearson; 3. Graham Docksey; 4. Naziya Singh; 5. Jackie Dunn	3,959	14.0	−4.2
Greens	1. Ashley Edwards (elected); 2. Kofi Isaacs; 3. Jill Pattinson; 4. Susie Monte; 5. Amanda Cohn	3,074	10.8	−1.4
Labor	1. Darren Cameron (elected); 2. Marcus Rowland; 3. Amelia Cameron; 4. Geoffrey Allen; 5. Christopher Ryan	2,714	9.5	−0.5
Independent	1. Daryl Betteridge (elected); 2. Barbara Hull; 3. Jodie Tiernan; 4. Brian Grenfell; 5. Mathew Tratz	2,661	9.4	+9.4
Hamilton Team	1. Ross Hamilton; 2. Dianne Thomas; 3. Emily Grellman; 4. Lucie Wallis; 5. Claire Hamilton	1,324	4.7	+4.7
Albury First	1. Henk Van de Ven; 2. Garry Pearce; 3. Paul Armstrong; 4. Bill Van Noordennen; 5. Christopher Martin	1,294	4.6	−8.3
Thurley	1. David Thurley (elected); 2. Mark Doyle; 3. Esther Heather; 4. John Moore; 5. Michael Machin	1,244	4.4	−4.3
Independent	1. Andrew Barber; 2. Sarah Watkins; 3. Trevor Barber; 4. C. Star; 5. Diane Harnett	768	2.7	+2.7
Independent	Peter Hood	51	0.2	+0.2
Total formal votes		28,374	94.2	+0.7
Informal votes		1,745	5.8	−0.7
Turnout		30,119	80.0	

=== 2012 ===
Elected councillor	Party
Alice Glachan	Alice Glachan Team
Graham Docksey	Alice Glachan Team
Patricia Gould	Independent (Group D)
Ross Jackson	Albury Citizens
Daryl Betteridge	Independent (Group E)
Kevin Mack	Independent (Group L)
Henk van de Ven	Independent (Group J)
Darren Cameron	Country Labor
David Thurley	Independent (Group H)

2012 New South Wales local elections: Albury
Party	Candidate	Votes	%	±%
Alice Glachan Team		3,879	16.1	
Independent (Group D)		3,683	15.8	
Albury Citizens and Ratepayers Movement		2,751	11.4	+2.0
Independent (Group E)		2,671	11.1	
Independent (Group L)		1,927	8.0	
Independent (Group J)		1,713	7.1	
Country Labor		1,565	6.5	+6.5
Independent (Group H)		1,507	6.3	
Independent (Group A)		1,173	4.9	
Independent (Group F)		1,102	4.6	
Independent (Group G)		1,065	4.4	
Independent (Group K)		667	2.8	
Independent	Breck Scott-Young	211	0.9	
Independent	Peter Hood	65	0.3	
Independent	Leigh Tornquist	60	0.2	
Turnout			79.6	

=== 1944 ===
1944 New South Wales local elections: Albury
Party	Candidate	Votes	%	±%
Independent	Dudley Padman	2,518		
Independent	Cleaver Bunton	2,278		
Independent	L. E. Heath	1,980		
Independent	H. Lamtert	1,875		
Independent	Alfred Waugh	1,846		
Independent	R. A. Robertson	1,628		
Independent	S. H. Logan	1,595		
Independent	J. P. Jelbart	1,582		
Independent	A. A. Rogers	1,581		

== Sister city ==
The City of Albury has a sister city with:

- Wodonga

== See also ==
- List of mayors of Albury
- List of local government areas in New South Wales
