= Flight 8 =

Flight 8 may refer to:

- TWA Flight 8, a 1938 aviation accident
- Reeve Aleutian Airways Flight 8, a 1983 aviation accident
- Starship flight test 8, an unsuccessful test flight of the SpaceX Starship rocket in March 2025
