= Uiver Collection =

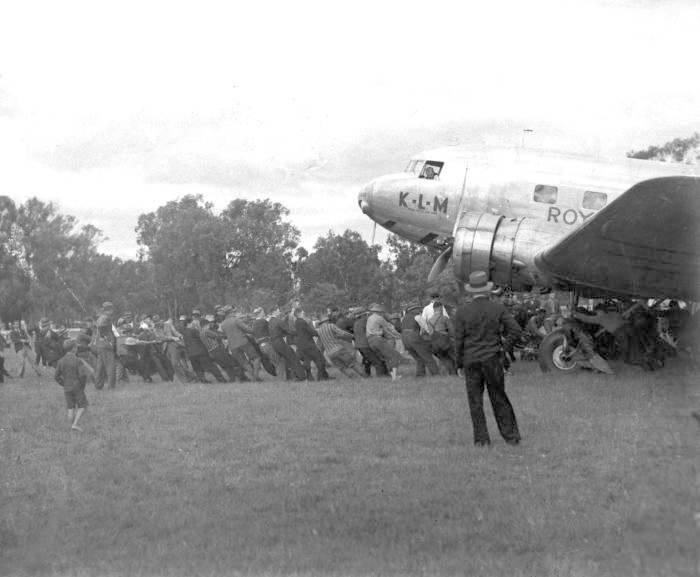
- Uiver airliner being pulled from the mud by volunteers at Albury Racecourse, 24 October 1934

- Location within New South Wales Location within Australia
- 36.0791°S 146.9163°E
- Location: 553 Kiewa Street, Albury, City of Albury, New South Wales, Australia

History
- Built: 1984–2016

Site notes
- Owner: Albury City Council

New South Wales Heritage Register
- Official name: The Uiver Collection; Uiver DC-2 Collection; The Uiver Memorial Collection – Albury Library and Museum
- Type: state heritage (movable / collection)
- Designated: 28 August 2017
- Reference no.: 1995
- Type: Community Objects
- Category: Collections

Uiver Collection is a heritage-listed museum collection at 553 Kiewa Street, Albury, City of Albury, New South Wales, Australia. It was built from 1984 to 2016. It is also known as The Uiver Collection, Uiver DC-2 Collection and The Uiver Memorial Collection - Albury Library and Museum. The property is owned by Albury City Council. It was added to the New South Wales State Heritage Register on 28 August 2017.

== History ==
A body known as the Centenary Council was formed in 1931 to arrange celebrations for the centenary of the settlement of Victoria (1834–1934), and of the founding of Melbourne (1835–1935). In 1933, the Centenary Council became incorporated in Victoria by statute and known as the Centenary Celebrations Council. The key event that it organised was the MacRobertson International Air Race from London to Melbourne. Although the Lord Mayor of Melbourne from October 1931 to December 1934, Sir Harold Gengoult-Smith, has been credited with the idea of holding the race, Eric V.E. Neill, the chairman of the council and Major Walter Conder (an organizer for the Council who in April 1933 left the council to become general manager of the Australian Broadcasting Commission) are also candidates for that honour. Melbourne-based chocolate manufacturer Sir Macpherson Robertson, known as "the chocolate king" sponsored the event to demonstrate the feasibility of a scheduled air service between Europe and Australia. Sir Macpherson Robertson offered fifteen thousand pounds prize money and a gold trophy, and the race attracted over 70 entries, of which 64 were allocated race numbers. A whittling down of entrants to the more serious competitors resulted in a final 20 aircraft from Australia, Australia-New Guinea, United States, Britain, Eire, Denmark, New Zealand and the Netherlands making the starting line. The racers took off from the Royal Air Force Mildenhall Aerodrome, 70 miles north of London.

The race started at 6:30 a.m. on Sunday 20 October 1934 with aeroplanes leaving at 45-second intervals. One of the most unusual entries was a Douglas DC-2 entered by KLM Royal Dutch Airlines. It was registered PH-AJU, and following the convention of the period was called "Uiver" after the name of a bird starting with the last letter of the registration code. "Uiver" is a Dutch word for "stork". It was the biggest competitor and the only craft to carry several passengers in addition to its crew of four. KLM Royal Dutch Airlines wanted to prove that they could serve Australia with a twice-weekly air service and they were using their brand new comfortably equipped all metal semi-monocoque monoplane to make their point. One other aeroplane had a single passenger. On board the "Uiver" were four crew: chief pilot Captain Koene Dirk Parmentier, co-pilot First Officer Jan Johannes Moll, Wireless Operator and Navigator Cornelis van Brugge, Aircraft Maintenance Engineer Bouwe Prins and three passengers, Roelof Jan Domenie, Piet M.J. Gilissen and Thea Rasche. The pilots, Captain Parmentier and First Officer Moll, knew much of the journey well as they flew the airline's weekly service to the Dutch East Indies. Albert Plesman, the founding Director of KLM, selected Moll for the flight to Australia because he had already flown to Australia. In 1931, Moll flew the KNILM Fokker FVIIB PK-AFC Abel Tasman on a proving flight for a proposed airmail service from Batavia (Netherlands East Indies) to Sydney and thence to Melbourne.

de Havilland DH.88 Comet racing aircraft specially designed for the event were favourites to win the speed section. A married couple, popular aviators Jim and Amy Mollison, known in the press as the "flying sweethearts", flew one of the Comets, named "Black Magic". Jim Mollison was a pioneering Scottish pilot who had flown commercially for Charles Kingsford Smith and Charles Ulm's ill-fated Australian National Airways. His wife Amy was Amy Johnson, who in May 1930 had become the first woman to fly solo from England to Australia, flying a de Havilland DH 60 Gipsy Moth "Jason". English aviators Flight Lieutenant Charles Scott and Kenyan coffee plantation manager Captain Tom Campbell Black flew another Comet, a red aircraft, dubbed "Grosvenor House" by the historic hotel's owner. A third de Havilland DH 88 Comet was flown by Cathcart Jones and K. F. Waller, and was the fourth aeroplane to arrive in Melbourne.

A day after the race began, an enthusiastic Sir Macpherson Robertson was in the Australian Broadcasting Commission Studios in Melbourne, and he said:

"Dear friends early yesterday morning before the sun had peaked over the horizon to disperse the mists enshrouding the Mildenhall Aerodrome in Suffolk, the competitors of the MacRobertson International Air Race were awaiting the signal to start on the epic flight of 11,323 miles. Never in the history of aviation has there been such a lineup of aviators and never in the history of the world has there been such an aerial contest. The Melbourne newspaper "The Argus" said in its editorial: "In an age of extraordinary mechanical progress one takes many things for granted; but flight halfway-across the world seems too remarkable for analysis. If the present conquest of speed be maintained at the present rate an air journey to England in these days will become commonplace. And Australia, that vast land over the edge of beyond will become part of a great world".

The KLM "Uiver" was only capable of flying 1,500-kilometre legs so had to refuel three times before the first official stop in Baghdad. The Dutch aeroplane landed only three hours behind the Mollison's de Havilland Comet, which was able to fly non-stop from England. It was apparent that the huge airliner was a formidable opponent. The Comets may have had speed but they were uncomfortable and extremely noisy. Jim and Amy Mollison arrived in Baghdad deaf, hungry and very tired. One eyewitness described the crew and passengers of the "Uiver" as being "as fresh as a daisy".

Excitement mounted worldwide as millions of people followed the race on their wireless sets. At Allahabad, India, the "flying sweethearts" had to withdraw their Comet from the race because of a broken oil line. The race to Victoria became a war of attrition. Dutch pilot Geysendorffer's Pander S4 was destroyed in a ground collision, also at Allahabad. Australian Jimmy Woods flipped his Lockheed Vega while landing at Aleppo in Northern Syria. A bumpy arrival in Bucharest, Hungary, caused damage to the flaps of American aviator Jacqueline Cochran's Granville R-6H. British entrants Gilman and Baines were both killed when their Fairey Fox I crashed near Palazzo San Gervasio in Italy. Tension mounted around the world as Charles Scott and Campbell Black in their Comet and Koene Parmentier and Jan Moll in the KLM DC-2 fought out the battle for first place.

A Time magazine article on 29 October 1934 described the course that covered 16 countries and three continents. It 'required night and day flying over country perilous with jagged mountains, snake infested jungles, deserts, hurricanes and typhoons. The toughest stretch may have been across the Syrian Desert where blinding sandstorms sometimes rise 20,000 feet and huge kite birds menace aerial navigation. Not much easier was the 2,210-mile jump from Allahabad to Singapore, with its Bay of Bengal water hop nearly as long as the North Atlantic. To the participants in the race, Lloyd's of London gave a 1-in-12 chance of being killed'. Between Singapore and Darwin, Scott and Black suffered a failure in one of the Comet's two engines. They just made it to Darwin. The "Uiver" was the second aircraft to arrive in Darwin and was well positioned to take out both the speed and the handicap sections of the race should the Comet be delayed for repairs or come to grief. Realistically, though, by the time the "Uiver" reached Darwin, the "Grosvenor House" Comet was well on the way to Melbourne and there was no chance of catching up in normal circumstances. Scott and Black knew of the increased risk occasioned by engine issues, but decided to take the risk and fly on. The "Uiver" had three passengers and taking a similar risk for them was never a possibility. In fact, the Douglas was so reliable that this kind of issue never arose. In the whole trip, only one part needed to be replaced, and this was done at Darwin. Parmentier learned at Charleville, southern Queensland, that Scott and Black had reached Melbourne. The bigger worry was that they would be passed by the Boeing 247D behind them, and this may well have been a factor in them deciding to press on, despite reports of adverse weather conditions ahead, which Moll was later to say should have caused them to pause in Charleville. The only reason why the Boeing 247D did not pass the "Uiver" while it was on the ground in Albury was because the Boeing struck engine trouble and had to land at Bourke for repairs.

The British Comet flew on, and seventy-one hours after take-off from London, Scott and Campbell Black crossed the finishing line at the Flemington Racecourse They took first honours in the speed section of the race along with the impressive MacRobertson Trophy and 10,000-pound prize money. The race rules stated each entrant could only win one section of the race, ruling them out of taking any prize in the handicap section despite coming first. Later in the year the English Royal Aero Club awarded the crew with "The Britannia Trophy" for their efforts. As the "Grosvenor House" touched down in Melbourne, the "Uiver" was at Charleville. The "Uiver" went via Batavia, because it was flying predominantly the standard route there. This added some distance to the total number of miles travelled.

The people in the small town of Albury on the New South Wales-Victoria border were following the race on the wireless as closely as everybody else in the world. On Tuesday 23 October, little did they know that within a few hours they were to be part of a drama which has become more famous than the record breaking race itself. It was a stormy lightning strewn night throughout nearly the whole of eastern Australia. Shortly after leaving the final official checkpoint in the Queensland town of Charleville on the last leg of the flight to Melbourne, the "Uiver" lost effective two-way radio contact. Race control does seem to have heard at least one of the three SOS calls that "Uiver" radio telegraphist Van Brugge made. Van Brugge heard the advice that they were reported as being over Yackandandah, that they should keep west and that lights at the airfield at Cootamundra were being switched on for them. With no effective aids for navigation the airliner had drifted off course. In Melbourne, air race officials were expecting the "Uiver" to arrive about thirty minutes after midnight. At about twenty minutes to midnight Albury residents heard a twin-engine aeroplane high overhead travelling towards Melbourne and assumed that the DC-2 was on its way to the finishing line. Half an hour later they were surprised to hear the roar of a twin-engine aeroplane circling low above the dense storm clouds over the eastern section of the town. Clifton Mott, a sub-editor from the local newspaper, Border Morning Mail, phoned air race officials in Melbourne from the newspaper office. They confirmed that the airliner had lost radio contact and was probably in grave danger. Arthur Newnham, an announcer and newsreader with the local ABC radio station 2CO, being unable to get a phone line at his home from the Albury manual telephone exchange, rushed to the radio studio in the Albury Post Office building to phone the ABC in Melbourne and tell them what was happening. On the way to the studio, Newnham devised a desperate rescue plan. Reginald Turner, District Postal Inspector based at the Albury Post Office, saw the "Uiver" turn and head off in a south-easterly direction towards the mountains, and fearing for the lives of those on board, set off for the post office to phone and inform race headquarters. All three men acted independently.

Flight Lieutenant Walter Armstrong, at race headquarters on the first floor of the tower of the Melbourne Town Hall, advised Mott to use a light to flash the letters of the word ALBURY in Morse code to let the pilots know where they were located. Mott reckoned that flashing the whole town's lights was better than flashing just one, so he phoned municipal electrical engineer Lyle Ferris and arranged to meet him at the Albury Post Office. When Turner reached the post office, probably from his East Albury home, he contacted race officials only to learn that they had already been informed of the aircraft's recent location. They advised him that they were continuing to try to contact the aircraft by wireless telegraphy and broadcasting. As Turner left the post office, he overheard a few people chatting and saying that the "Uiver" would come to grief in the mountainous country towards which it was now flying. It was then that Mott appeared, running along Dean Street to the post office. He approached Turner and asked him if he could get a telegraphist so as to signal to the aircraft as suggested by Armstrong. Turner indicated that he knew Morse code and could do the signalling if he had control of some lights. Mott then explained that Ferris was on the way, and on his arrival, the three men drove to the nearby electricity sub-station. Ferris pointed out the main switch, which Turner then used to cause the street lights to spell A .- L .-.. B - U ..- R .-. Y -.-- followed by dots. They repeated this for about half an hour, but the "Uiver" was neither to be seen nor heard, so they drove back to the post office. Unknown to those on the ground, the crew of the "Uiver" had seen the flashing street lights but because of turbulence and poor visibility were not actually able to read the Morse code.

In the meantime, Newnham's neighbour Barclay Dowling drove Newnham to the Dean Street door of the post office building, where stairs to the first floor led to the telephone exchange and the 2CO studio. As they drove, Newnham formulated the desperate rescue plan-to call on motor vehicles to proceed to the Albury Racecourse and illuminate a landing strip for the aircraft in distress. The thought frightened Newnham, because should the aircraft make an unsuccessful landing, he would be responsible for the consequences. He decided to implement the plan anyway. Consequently, Dowling dropped Newnham at the studio and then proceeded to the racecourse, where he teamed up with Albury Racing Club secretary Bertie Peacock and his son Donald in marshalling the arriving vehicles so that they formed a crescent around the perimeter of the racecourse.

On gaining entry to the building and climbing the stairs to the radio studio, Newnham was faced with the problem of not having a technician who could manipulate the radio controls to allow him to break into radio 3AR on relay from Melbourne. Newnham had no idea as to what buttons to push, so he phoned his regular technician, Bob Mathews, to hasten to the studio-but that would cost some time.

To make matters worse, the studio lights began flickering, as did the town lights. Newnham soon came to realise that they were spelling the word ALBURY in Morse code, but it was not until later than he learned that Ferris and Turner were responsible for this unique method of communication.

Fortunately, an assistant in the telephone exchange, Charlie Walters, was alert as to what was happening, and switched on the ringer circuit on a phone that connected directly with the Corowa transmitter control room. Newnham rang 2CO and spoke to the mechanic on duty, Jim Nicholls, and told him of his intentions. They decided to patch the phone on to the transmitter, which had the effect of using the microphone in the telephone handset in the Albury studio to produce the sound that would be transmitted. At 12:55 am, 3AR on relay from Melbourne went off air and Newnham went to air.

2CO Corowa. In an endeavour to assist Parmentier and the crew of the Dutch aeroplane which is flying apparently lost in the vicinity of Albury, it is suggested that owners of cars in the Albury district should proceed to the Albury Racecourse and with their headlamps illuminate the course so that, should Parmentier decide to land, an illuminated ground will be prepared.

Newnham repeated the call for car owners to proceed to the racecourse, and after a short pause, vehicles could be heard through the open studio window, all making speedily for the racecourse.

No sooner had Mott, Turner and Ferris returned to the post office after signalling for half an hour with no aircraft to be heard, when they heard the sound of the "Uiver". They doubled back to the sub-station and resumed flashing the town lights until they saw the aircraft drop two parachute flares and come in for a landing.

The weather conditions had caused the "Uiver" to drift a long way east of its intended course; the "Uiver" should have crossed the Murray River near Echuca. With two-way radio communications lost because of the storm, it had not been possible for the drift to be corrected. After passing over Albury, the "Uiver" made at least two forays towards the mountains of the Great Dividing Range, before returning to the lights of Albury. Icing up of wings and propellers had made passage to Melbourne impossible. The "Uiver" finally turned and headed for an airfield at Cootamundra, and re-located the Albury lights-but this time they were flashing as if to convey a message. The pilots then saw a crescent of car headlights illuminating a makeshift landing strip on the central area of the Albury Racecourse. At 1:17 a.m., after dropping two parachute flares to check out the suitability of the ground below for a landing, and with its powerful nose landing lights on, the "Uiver" made a perfect emergency landing. In the occasional light of a cloud-smeared full moon, the "Uiver" descended onto an area known as "plumpton", an enclosed area that was used for the greyhound coursing of live hares. The "Uiver" navigated a gap between trees and landed from south to north, its wheels first touching the ground short of the halfway point of the plumpton, from where it rolled in a northerly direction along the western side of the roughly oval-shaped racecourse. It came to rest towards the northern end of the racecourse opposite the Leger Stand, since demolished, but which was then a short distance south of the grandstand, since demolished but replaced. The "Uiver" became deeply bogged, and any attempt to free it had to be postponed until after dawn.

From the time of Newnham's call over the radio for motorcars to go to the racecourse to illuminate a landing strip for the aircraft to the time when the "Uiver" touched down safely, just 22 minutes had elapsed. The innovative actions of Albury townsfolk had saved the "Uiver".

Captain Parmentier said later that they had seen the Morse signals but because of the excessive turbulence from the thunderstorm they were unable to read them.

ABC's Cleaver Bunton recalled that, "it was a remarkable piece of aviation that the plane got down safely, literally missing trees by very small margins. The amount of people who got to the racecourse was remarkable. Not only were cars there in big numbers but there was also a colossal crowd of people there too. It was fortunate actually that the racecourse was waterlogged as a result of the heavy rain we'd had. It saved the plane from overrunning. There is no doubt in the world that it would have overrun had it not been waterlogged as it was". 2CO's Newnham interviewed Captain Parmentier and passenger Gilissen on-air shortly after the miraculous escape. The broadcast was relayed across Australia and directly to Holland. Captain Parmentier told 2CO that there was no doubt that the setting up of the runway with the aid of motor headlamps saved the aeroplane from crashing and indeed saved the lives of the crew and their passengers. Early in the afternoon, Wireless Operator Van Brugge told his story and conveyed his thanks to the people of Albury for their actions and support.

People around the world were listening to these broadcasts and one of those listeners was a young Dutchman in Amsterdam, Ben Vene. He later lived in Albury for a number of years, and vividly recalled the events as they unfolded over the radio. "I was just 20 years old at the time and we were listening to the drama while the aeroplane was as we thought flying over Albury on the local wireless. We heard about the electrical storm. Then we heard about the Morse signs with street lights and cars being asked to go to the racecourse and making a landing strip for the aeroplane to come down. We knew about Melbourne being the end of the race but Albury was something entirely new to us. We had to look at a map to find out where it was. After the race the name of "Albury" in Holland came-to mean more to us than Melbourne and Sydney".

The morning after the landing a huge crowd gathered at the racecourse to lend what assistance they could. Clive Crosser, a retired builder from Albury was 12 years old at the time, said: "I had a pushbike and I hopped on and went out as early as I could. There were hundreds of people there. When I arrived the plane was pretty much hopelessly entrenched in the mud. Somebody showed up with a truck and a heap of planks and they put the wood underneath the wheels of the aircraft and ran the motors. It started to look dangerous as the planks began to tip up in the air and it looked like they were going to hit the props. The pilot waved them away and they abandoned the idea".

On the 50th anniversary of the incident in 1984, Albury's Cecil Meredith recalled his part in the drama. In 1934, Meredith was working on the construction of the Hume Reservoir. Early on the morning of 24 October 1934, while on his way to work, he deviated to the race track to help haul the aeroplane out of the mud. "The wireless operator Van Brugge asked me would I take charge of hauling her off so I took over and eventually we hauled her off. There were about 50 to 60 people on each rope, there were two ropes. From the time the wheel started to move it was about twenty five to thirty minutes removing her from the mud." Moving the aeroplane by pulling the rope took place once at the northern end of the racecourse and twice at the southern end and also involved men in lifting the tail to accommodate changing the direction in which the aeroplane was pointing. The aircraft was stripped of anything that could be dispensed with. Personal suitcases including 35,000 [by other accounts, 26,000] letters from Holland, and all passengers and crew other than the captain and first officer, were left offloaded in Albury. Clive Crosser said: "that caused a lot of trouble, a lot of sadness. Passenger Thea Rasche cried her eyes out when the aeroplane finally departed". At 9:55 a.m., Captain Parmentier took off and flew the "Uiver" on to Melbourne to take second place in the speed section of the Centenary Air Race and second place but first prize in the handicap section. Out of the twenty aircraft that left Mildenhall, England on 20 October, only nine finished the course in the time allowed by the race rules.

Shortly after their arrival in Melbourne, Parmentier and Moll spoke to the ABC. Parmentier said: "The first thing I want to tell you is that I am very grateful for all the things that the national broadcasting commission has done to make our landing last night possible at the racecourse in Albury. I must express my thanks for the help I had from the Mayor of Albury and the population who were very helpful this morning to get our plane out of the mud and to make it possible for us to take off". Moll echoed his friend's sentiments. 'My dear Australian listeners, I express my thanks to the population of Albury and Mayor Mr. Alfred Waugh for the splendid help they gave us to make us land safely. Also the assistance they gave us the next morning to get us here to Melbourne and be second in this great air race.'

In Holland, where the entire country had been following the progress of the race on the radio, their excitement knew no bounds when the "Uiver" took the handicap prize. Commemorative "Uiver" postage stamps were issued, songs were written, and thousands of souvenir mementos were produced. As the name of the airliner Uiver meant "stork", newborn babies were christened "Uiverjay" or "little stork". The actions of the Albury people on that stormy night and the following morning would not be forgotten. Queen Wilhelmina sent a cable to Waugh advising him that he would be invested as an Officier in the Order of Orange-Nassau. The investiture took place in Albury on 17 December 1934 in a ceremony conducted by Mr. Paul Staal, Consul-General for the Netherlands. When Alfred Waugh and his wife Ellen went to the Netherlands in August 1935, Queen Wilhelmina was unable to grant the Waugh's an audience with her there as she was at her holiday residence in Scotland. Nevertheless, on 21 August 1935, Alfred and Ellen Waugh, the butchers from Townsend Street, Albury went to St Fillans where they had afternoon tea with Queen Wilhelmina.

With the assistance of the people of Albury, the "Uiver" returned to the race, crossed the finish line to win the handicap prize, and placed second overall in the speed section behind a purpose-build two-seater wood and fabric racer. Operating with a regular KLM crew carrying passengers and mail on a standard schedule, the aircraft's performance demonstrated the viability of production-line all-metal semi-momocoques over wood and fabric aeroplanes, flying boats, and zeppelins, for commercial air transport.

Several days after its dramatic rescue the "Uiver" again passed over Albury on the first leg of its journey back to Europe. The aeroplane flew low over the town and a cigarette case containing a small Dutch flag and a message was dropped onto the racecourse. The message read: "To all our good friends in Albury, we salute you and say farewell". The farewell was destined to be prophetic. Only eight weeks after its triumph in the centenary air race the "Uiver" crashed near Rutbah Wells in the Syrian Desert in Iraq and all those aboard were killed. None of those killed were on board the "Uiver" on its flight to Australia. Funded by subscriptions taken up in Albury, a bronze-and-marble statuette crafted by Paul Montford, the sculptor for Melbourne's Shrine of Remembrance, was on 15 August 1935, presented to the mayor of Amsterdam, Dr W. de Vlught, as an expression of thanks for the generosity of the people of Holland following the saving of the "Uiver" by the people of Albury, and to the memory of those who lost their lives in the subsequent crash landing of the "Uiver".

Radio operator Cornelis van Brugge died in 1943 when the Luftwaffe shot down the KLM DC-3 chartered by BOAC in which he was flying over the Bay of Biscay en route from Lisbon to Bristol. Captain Koene Parmentier died in 1948 when his Lockheed Constellation hit a high-voltage cable and crashed at Tarbolton near Glasgow, Scotland while he was attempting to land in foggy conditions at Prestwick Airport. Flight Engineer Bouwe Prins died in retirement in 1973 in Den Helder, Holland, and Commodore Jan Moll, the Uiver's first officer and later commodore, retired in 1954 and died in 1988 in Aalsmeer, Holland.

Whenever and wherever stories of epic achievements in aviation are recounted, the flight of the "Uiver" will be recalled, as also will be the part played by the citizens of Albury on that storm-swept night in October 1934. In 1984, Australian composer Peter Flanagan wrote the Flying Dutchman Suite for the re-enactment of the "Uiver" flight. In 1984, to commemorate the events of 1934, the Netherlands Broadcasting Corporation produced a three-part television documentary highlighting KLM's involvement in the famous air race. To help fund the project the Uiver Memorial Foundation was established in Holland. In order to recreate the flight of the original "Uiver" it was necessary to find a DC-2 that could be made airworthy. One was found in a private collection in the United States. The aeroplane was completely overhauled and refurbished at the Schiphol Airport in Amsterdam. It was painted in 1934 KLM livery and given the original registration of the first "Uiver". The crew of four was fitted out with KLM uniforms in the style of 50 years before. Captain of the crew was KLM 747 Jumbo-jet pilot Captain Jan Plesman, a grandson of Dr Albert Plesman, whose decision it was as Founder and Director of KLM to buy the Douglas DC-2 that became known as the "Uiver". The re-enactment flight to Australia re-traced the original air race route. The journey took five weeks because of filming commitments instead of the three and three quarter days that the original aeroplane took to reach its destination. The events at Albury were recreated for the film. On their final approach to the new Albury airport the "Uiver" passed low over the racecourse where it had all happened fifty years earlier. A crowd of several thousand was at the airport to greet the new "Uiver". Welcoming the re- enactment crew, Albury Mayor, Councillor John Roach, said: 'It's a wonderful day and a lot of people have been very interested and keen since first hearing about the Uiver Foundation's re-enactment of this flight. It's a wonderful spectacle and we are very pleased that the aeroplane has landed here and they'll be the guests of the city for a few days. I'm sure a lot of people will reminisce and get together with the crew'. As the "Uiver" rested on the lawn at the western end of the tarmac a band played the national anthem of the Netherlands. Pilot Jan Plesman said: "We were very interested to see the racecourse and how long it is. I think those guys did a good job at that time. It is a much greater achievement than what we have done especially navigation wise". He conceded that they were cheating on navigation a little bit for the modern day flight. Captain Jan Plesman said that after the 1934 incident, Albury Mayor, Alderman Alf Waugh, was the most popular man in Holland. "In Holland, Albury is on the map and everybody knows where it is." After four days filming in Albury the "Uiver II" flew on to Melbourne, the place where the race ended in 1934.

== Description ==
The Uiver Collection of 286 items (archival, audio-visual and object-based) is owned and managed by the Albury City Council. The Dutch National Aviation Museum Aviodrome in The Netherlands holds the only known collection that compares to that held in NSW. The Uiver Collection has strong provenance and is in good condition. It covers the principal thematic areas of the "Uiver Story", the MacRobertson International Centenary Air Race 1934, the Douglas DC-2 aircraft and Dutch/Australian relations. Together these attributes provide abundant material for interpretation.

=== Condition ===
Overall, the items in the Uiver Memorial Collection are in good condition. The collection is managed by the Albury Library Museum according to best practice national standards by a team of professional collection managers and curators.

== Heritage listing ==
The Uiver Collection is of state significance as a collection of ephemera relating to the flight of the Uiver in the MacRobertson International Centenary Air Race of 1934. The flight was the first commercial passenger flight between Europe and Australia. The Uiver's emergency landing in Albury and ultimate success of the Uiver in the race, contributed to the development of air travel in Australia. The story is a unique historical event in the relationship between Australia and the Netherlands that culminated in the establishment of Australia's first migration agreement with a foreign country when signed by Australia and the Netherlands in 1939.

Uiver Collection was listed on the New South Wales State Heritage Register on 28 August 2017 having satisfied the following criteria.

The place is important in demonstrating the course, or pattern, of cultural or natural history in New South Wales.

The Uiver Collection is of state significance for its historical values as a collection focussed on the last of the great pioneering air races between Europe and Australia and the first commercial international passenger flight to Australia. The success of the flight of the Uiver heralded the development of international air travel in Australia and the development of the Douglas Commercial (DC) series of aircraft as the air carrier. It is claimed it directly led to the establishment of the first foreign corporation licensed to establish an air service in Australia in 1938.

The story, told through the collection, of the Uiver's emergency landing and assistance by the people of Albury may be historically significant as the catalyst for the significant relationship that developed between Australia and The Netherlands, cemented with ongoing visitation between the two countries and culminating in the establishment of Australia's first migration agreement with a foreign country when signed by Australia and The Netherlands in 1939.

The place has a strong or special association with a particular community or cultural group in New South Wales for social, cultural or spiritual reasons.

The Uiver Collection is of state significance for its special association with contemporary communities with an interest in aviation history and with those "keepers" of the story of the Uiver which has entered the pantheon of stories relating to pioneering aviation in Australia and NSW. The story is known throughout the Dutch community in NSW (and The Netherlands) and often retold in writings on the subject of the Dutch in Australia.

The place has potential to yield information that will contribute to an understanding of the cultural or natural history of New South Wales.

The Uiver Collection is of state significance for its potential to reveal further information about the introduction of the DC2 to Australian commercial aviation and may also reveal information about the MacRobertson International Centenary Air Race of 1934.

The place possesses uncommon, rare or endangered aspects of the cultural or natural history of New South Wales.

The Uiver Collection is of state significance because the Uiver Collection is identified as the largest collection of materials in NSW relating to the Uiver Story, the Douglas DC-2 aircraft, and the MacRobertson International Centenary Air Race of 1934.

The place is important in demonstrating the principal characteristics of a class of cultural or natural places/environments in New South Wales.

The Uiver Collection is of state significance through demonstrating the principal characteristics of a collection relating to an aircraft of importance to the people of NSW.
