= 1935 San Giacomo Douglas DC-2 crash =

1935 aviation accident

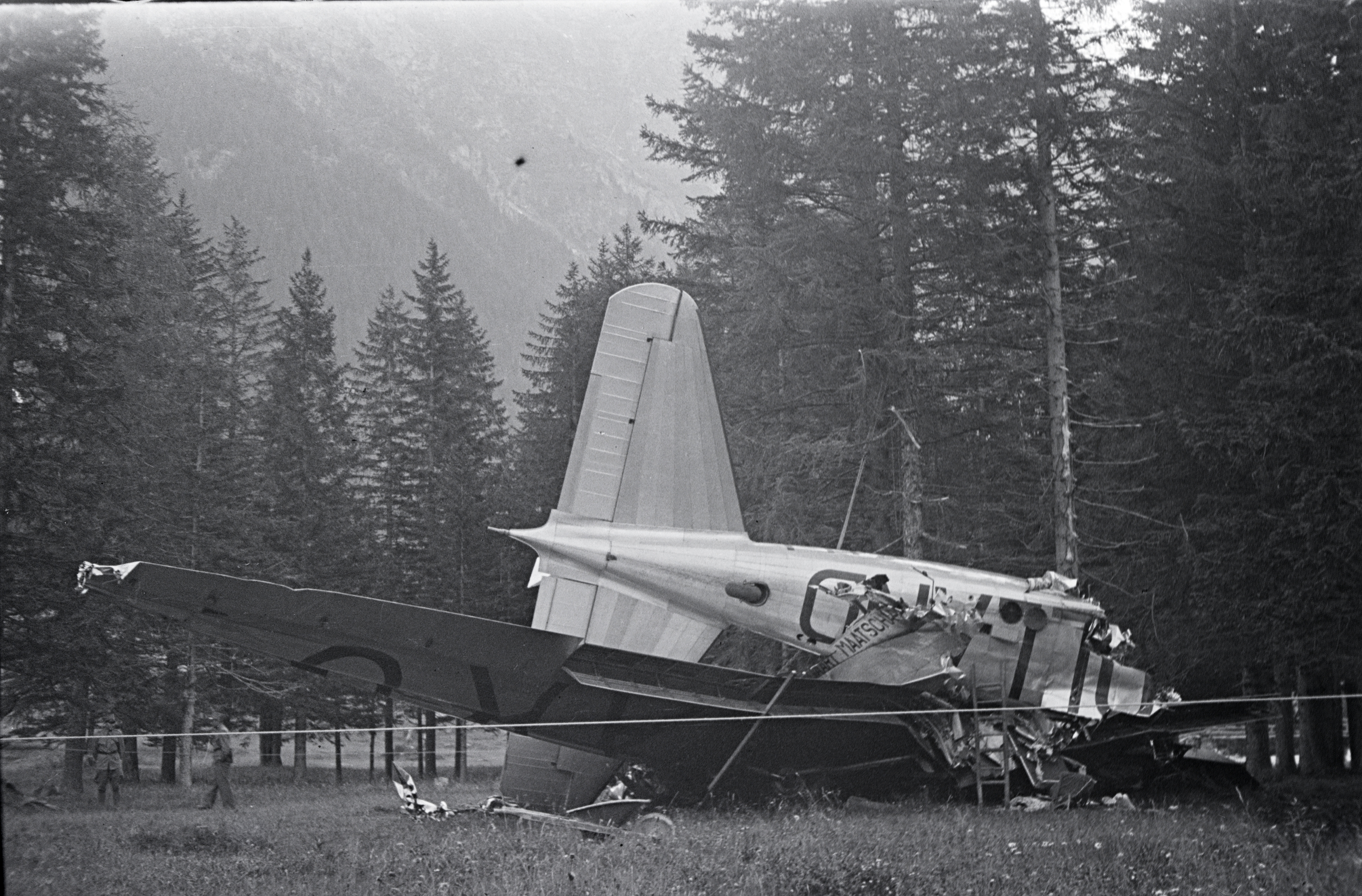
- crash site

Accident
- Date: 20 July 1935
- Summary: Failed emergency landing attempt due to Poor Weather
- Site: Pian San Giacomo, Switzerland

Aircraft
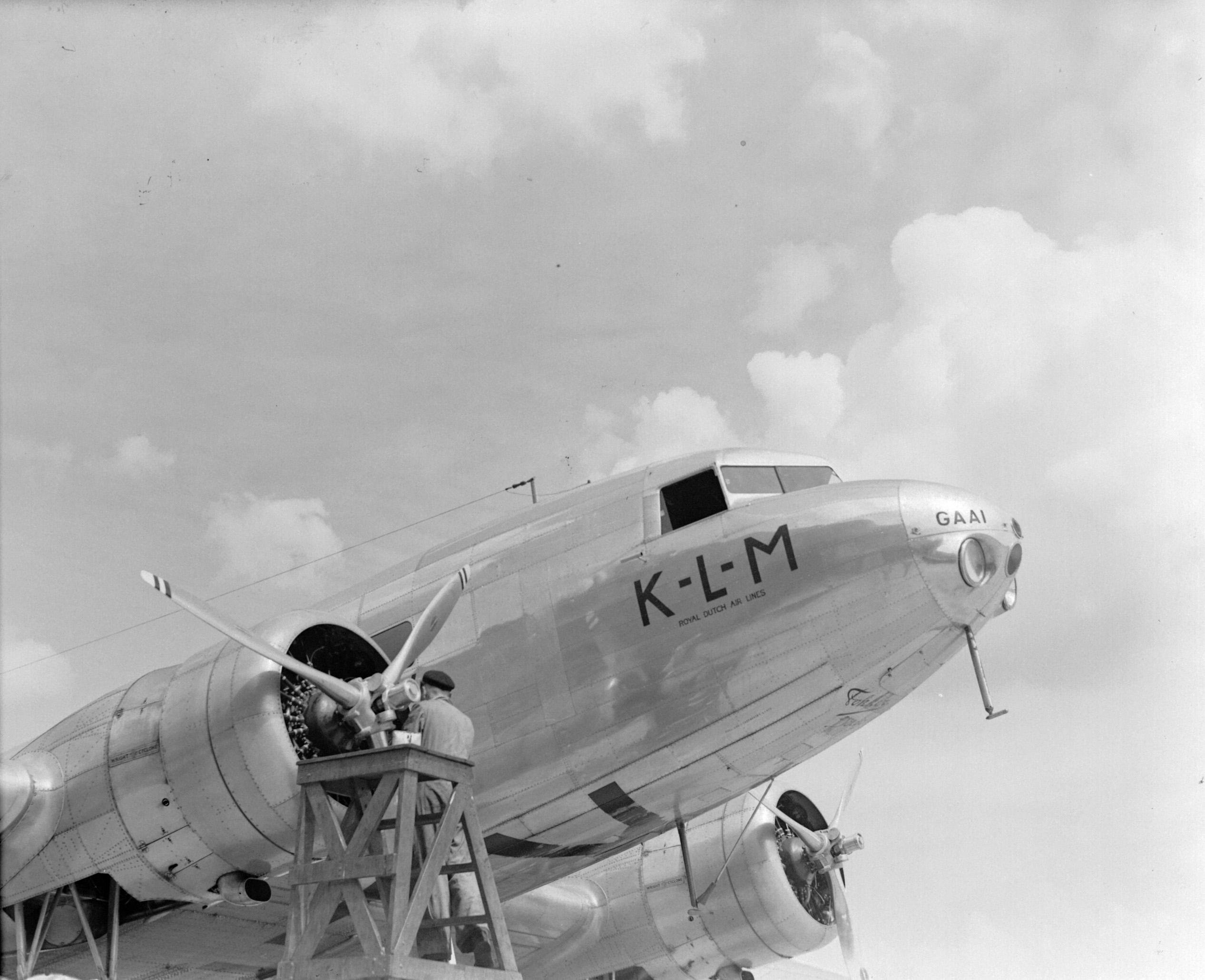
- PH-AKG, the aircraft involved
- Aircraft type: Douglas DC-2-115E
- Aircraft name: Gaai
- Operator: KLM
- Registration: PH-AKG
- Flight origin: Milan, Italy
- Stopover: Frankfurt, Germany
- Destination: Amsterdam, Netherlands
- Passengers: 9
- Crew: 4
- Fatalities: 13 (initially 12)
- Survivors: 0 (initially 1)

On 20 July 1935 a Douglas DC-2 aircraft, registration PH-AKG, operated by KLM, flying from Milan, Italy to Schiphol, Amsterdam, in the Netherlands crashed at Pian San Giacomo, Switzerland, killing all thirteen people on board, in the deadliest KLM accident at that time. It was the company's third international passenger flight accident in one week, which became known as the "black week". This left KLM short of crew and airplanes, and routes were given up; the Amsterdam−Milan route was taken over by Deutsche Lufthansa.

== Flight and crash ==
The Douglas DC-2 PH-AKG (named: "Gaai") operated by KLM departed on 20 July 1935 at 11:56am local time for a scheduled international flight from Milan, Italy to Frankfurt, Germany. On board were thirteen people: 9 passengers and 4 crew members.

Flying over Switzerland, the aircraft flew over the pass at San Bernardino from the Moësa valley and would leave it via the northern pass. While flying over the pass, the plane encountered severe weather with heavy thunderstorms, torrential rain and drop in temperature. The pilot decided to fly at a lower altitude. Due to clouds, the pilot was not able to exit the valley via the north exit. The pilot turned and attempted to exit the valley via the southern exit, but this also failed. While flying above San Bernardino they reported over the radio "I'm flying blind and looking for my position"; and later "we have to deal with heavy rain and dense fog". The plane flew in circles in the valley to find an exit for over 20 minutes and the pilot descended further to gain visibility. The pilot decided to make an emergency landing on hilly terrain just outside San Giacomo at 12:30. The landing failed and the plane broke in half. The aircraft was crushed from front to back with only the tailpiece still intact, and the bottom part was heavily damaged.

A Red Cross team from Bellinzona arrived shortly after the accident. Soldiers and Swiss border guards from Bellinzona cordoned off the area, and the wreck remained guarded.

All passengers and crew members were killed in the crash, many mutilated beyond recognition. One flight attendant was not killed immediately, but died shortly after. The bodies were transported by truck to San Giacomo and laid down in coffins at the local Catholic church.

== The aircraft ==
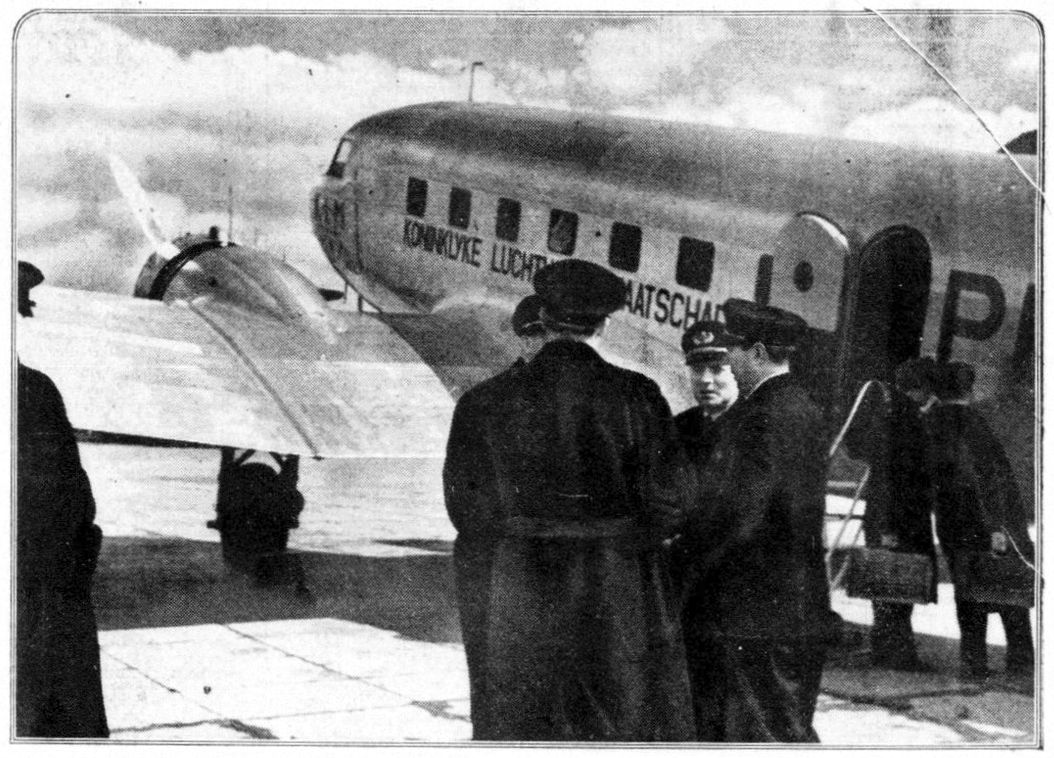
Aircraft the “Gaai” earlier in 1935

The American-built Douglas DC-2 PH-AKG, named "Gaai", was delivered by Douglas to KLM on 22 March 1935 and flew to New York on this date. From there the airplane was dismantled and shipped by SS "Bremen" to Cherbourg where it arrived on 5 April and arrived three days later in Rotterdam on 8 April. On 30 March 1935, the aircraft was registered in the Dutch civil aviation register. PH-AKG was the first of a series of 14 DC-2s delivered to KLM in 1935.

== Victims ==
The four crew members and nine passengers on board died in the crash.

=== Crew ===
- Johannes Simon Wilhelm Van der Feijst (born 17 October 1904 in Scheveningen) was the first pilot of the airplane. He started working at KLM on 1 May 1932 and had made 3,200 flying hours. He made ten return flights to the Dutch East Indies as co-pilot and many European flights as captain. He was an experienced pilot who had flown this Amsterdam-Milan route several times. Van der Feijst was married, had 2 children and lived in Heemstede.
- Rudolf Aafjes (born on 19 April 1907 in Bussum) was the radio operator. He started working at KLM on 22 October 1934. He was married, had no children and lived in Rijk in Haarlemmermeer.
- Johannes Casparus Jacobus Vocke (born 19 May 1909 in Haarlem) was the mechanical engineer. He started working at KLM on 13 June 1927. He was a valued technician, who previously helped to assemble Douglas machines (by ship from America) in Cherbourg, so that he gained great experience with this type of airplane. For this reason he became assigned as flight engineer on the DC-2. He was unmarried and lived in Haarlem.
- Anna Elisabeth Hermanides (born 1908 in Noordwijk) was the first flight attendant of the KLM. She had just been employed by KLM and did not yet have a permanent contract. That's the reason she wasn't wearing a uniform yet. This was her third trip, and meant to gain experience. She was looking forward to her permanent employment, which would have started on 1 August 1935.

=== Passengers ===
- Gerard Jacques Philips (35 years old) was director of the parquet flooring factory “De Tropen” in Tilburg and lived in Vught.
- Virginia Philips-Hurtubis (25 years old) was the wife of Gerard Jacques Philips.
- Abraham Alexander Content (52 years old) lived in Berlin as a representative for Van den Bergh Ltd. in Rotterdam.
- Alexander Abraham (14 years old) was the son of Abraham Alexander Content.
- Joseph Martinus Maria “Jos” van Langen (born 8 November 1909 in Purmerend) was foreign editor of the daily newspaper De Tijd. He wrote notes during the flight, that turned out to be important in the investigation.
- Sybe Hoogstra (52 years old) was director of the NV tot Exploitatie der Haveninrichtingen in Dordrecht.
- L.M. Nesbit was a journalist with many publications on adventure travel. He was single and lived in Rome, Italy.
- Arthur George Watts (born 28 April 1883 in Rochester) was a British artist and illustrator who lived in Hampstead.
- G.A. Flohr was director of a metalware factory in Worms, Germany.

=== Funerals ===
All Dutch victims were buried in the Netherlands on 26 July 1935. The other victims were buried in their home countries.

- Abraham Alexander Content and his son Alexander Abraham were buried after a Jewish ceremony in German and Hebrew language in the morning at Zorgvliet in Amsterdam.
- Pilot Johannes Simon Wilhelm Van der Feijst and radio operator Rudolf Aafjes were buried at Zorgvliet in the afternoon. The funeral was attended by many delegates including of the KLM the president Albert Plesman the president of the supervisory board August Wurfbain and Hans Martin. Stationmaster of Schiphol A.S. Thomson and stationmaster of Waalhaven A.C. Tolk. A. Stephan of Nederlandse Vliegtuigenfabriek, Rendorp of the K.N.I.L.M, Governmental aviation inspector H. G. van der Heijden and of the PTT the president Marinus Damme and W.R. van Goor. The mayor of Haarlemmermeer Adriaan Slob, Alderman of Amsterdam J. ter Haar and N. Nobel of the Bureau voor Handelsinlichtingen. There were also representatives of Soesterberg Air Base, De Kooy Airfield and of foreign airlines.
- Jos van Langen was buried in Purmerend at the Roman Catholic cemetery, so funeral procession went from Zorgvliet to Purmerend. The funeral was attended by among others KLM representative LH Slotrmakers and the mayor of Purmerend Hendrik Cramwinckel. No public was allowed at the cemetery.
- Mechanical engineer Johannes Casparus Jacobus Vocke was buried at the St Barbara Roman Catholic Cemetery in Haarlem. The evening before the funeral the body was moved to the St Joseph church were a ceremony was held in the morning. The funeral was attended by among others KLM representative Spit; Smit of the Fokker factory and J. Steenbeek of the K.N.I.L.M..
- Flight attendant Hermanides was buried in Noordwijk.
- Gerard Jacques Philips and his wife Virginia Philips-Hurtubis were buried in a family grave in Zaltbommel.
- Sybe Hoogstra was buried at the cemetery in Dordrecht.

== Reactions ==
Many people expressed their condolences including Queen Wilhelmina of the Netherlands via a telegram, and the government of Ticino.

KLM considered stopping flying over the Alps, and avoiding flying in bad weather. Switzerland also discussed stricter safety measures when flying over the Alps.

Aircraft critics questioned why the plane flew between the mountains and not above them. Also, because the pilot had flown the route already ten times, and knew it was important to fly at a high altitude over the Alps. Aviation "Het Vliegveld" published a review article with comments made in journals worldwide about the accident of the Gaai. It stated among others that the United States uses many of these Douglas airplanes, but switches to other kind of airplanes in bad weather. The official enquiry concluded that the pilot's actions were not at fault.

== Black week and consequences ==
The disasters was at the time KLM's deadliest accident. The accident was the third major airplane accident in one week after the crash of the "Kwikstaart" in Amsterdam and the "Maraboe" in Bushir. The week of 14 to 20 July 1935 is known as the "black week". In these three crashes KLM lost three airplanes and lost crew in two crashes. With an earlier crash in April of the "Leeuwerik" KLM had lost in 1935 around 15% of its pilots. As a result there was a shortage of crew members and airplanes. The Amsterdam—Milan flight service had to be taken over completely by Deutsche Lufthansa, with which KLM had previously operated these flights in collaboration.

== Notebook of Jos van Langen ==
In the wreck the notebook was found of Jos van Langen, foreign editor of the daily newspaper De Tijd. He had been taking notes until very shortly before the crash. On five pages he wrote initially very clearly and in full sentences, but the notes became shorter and scribbled shortly before the accident.

The relatives of Van Langen gave the notebook to De Tijd newspaper; it was published in August 1935. The notebook is property of the Persmuseum in Amsterdam, and is stated to be one of their main items.

Original text in Dutch

Milano 20/7
12 uur slaat de klok in de Gaai
met 10-tal passagiers, meest Hollanders
De Tijd brengt ons op de hoogte van het ongeluk van de “Maraboe”, nadat een medepassagier ons op de hoogte had gebracht van de ramp van zondag j.l.
Een wees gegroet en schietgebedje tot Sint Christoforus geven vertrouwen
Al gauw boven de wolken; vrij regelmatig
Dwars door de wolken; alles wit
stijgen 3000 M.
Regen tegen de ramen
4000
4500 boven de wolken
hemelblauw zichtbaar
4600
4700
bijna 5000
regen klettert
geen blauw meer
regen
half één
knal
dalen snel
4000
3800
3200
sneeuw
3000
2800
2500
2400
vlak boven toppen
bliksem
2100

Translation:
English translation

Milan 20/7
it's 12 o’clock in the Gaai
with around 10 passengers, most Dutch
De Tijd informs us of the accident of the "Maraboe", after a fellow passenger informed us of the disaster of last Sunday
A say goodbye and quick prayer to Saint Christopher give confidence
Soon above the clouds; quite regular
Straight through the clouds; all regular
rise 3000 M.
Rain against the windows
4000
4500 above the clouds
blue sky visible
4600
4700
almost 5000
rain patters
no more blue
rain
half past twelve
boom
quickly descend
4000
3800
3200
snow
3000
2800
2500
2400
just above (tree)tops
lightning
2100

The course of the flight can almost be followed minute-by-minute. It starts with cloud cover above the airport. A regularly ascent through the rainy clouds up to 4500 metres where the blue sky becomes visible. At an altitude of almost 5000 metres there is dense cloud cover. The rain can be heard loudly. At that time it is 11:30am And is everything as normal. But then a boom is heard, not stated if it was thunder or a failure. The plane descends quickly. Only altimeters are noted. The quickly written numbers indicates an unusual event. At 3200 metres ”Snow” is written down, indicating ice formation. A further descent to 2400 meters just above the tree tops, so the plane flies (almost) below the clouds so that the ground can be seen. There is lightning and the last that is written down is 2100.

Van Langen's notes were found to contain important information, and were used in the investigation to answer why the plane flew between the mountains and not above them.

== Investigation ==
The investigation was done by the Dutch Government Study Service for Aviation (Rijksstudiedienst voor de Luchtvaart) and led by Dr. Ir. van der Maas and Ir. van der Heijden. Fifteen minutes after departure from Milan the plane was at an altitude of 1800 metres. Above the Alps the plane would have been, according to their calculations, at an altitude of around 4000 metres. Due to icing and bad weather, the plane had to descend when it flew over the Alps.

=== Conclusions ===
According to the final report the plane came to an altitude of 5000 m (in a thundercloud) in a hypothermic rain. As a result, very strong icing suddenly occurred. Due to the irregular detachment of ice from the propeller blades, strong vibrations of the aircraft occurred and the pilots were forced to turn down the engines. However, with turned down engines, the plane quickly lost altitude. The icing disappeared not above 3000 meters, and at that altitude the plane was surrounded by mountain tops, in very poor visibility due to the bad weather. With the skills of the pilot, he succeeded in obtaining ground visibility at an altitude of around 1600 meters and tried to find a way out of the San Giacomo valley. Presumably because the exit was completely shrouded in mist, the pilot saw no other option than to make an emergency landing. With the engines off, flaps extended and landing gear retracted, he made a belly landing on highly hilly terrain. However, in the left turn before landing, the plane lost too much speed, "tilted" forward and crashed to the ground, killing all occupants.

=== Congress of the International Air Traffic Association ===
Partly due to this crash, in November 1935 icing was a main topic at the congress of the International Air Traffic Association.
