= TWA Flight 8 =

1938 aviation accident

Coordinates: 37°35′46.74″N 119°29′36.53″W

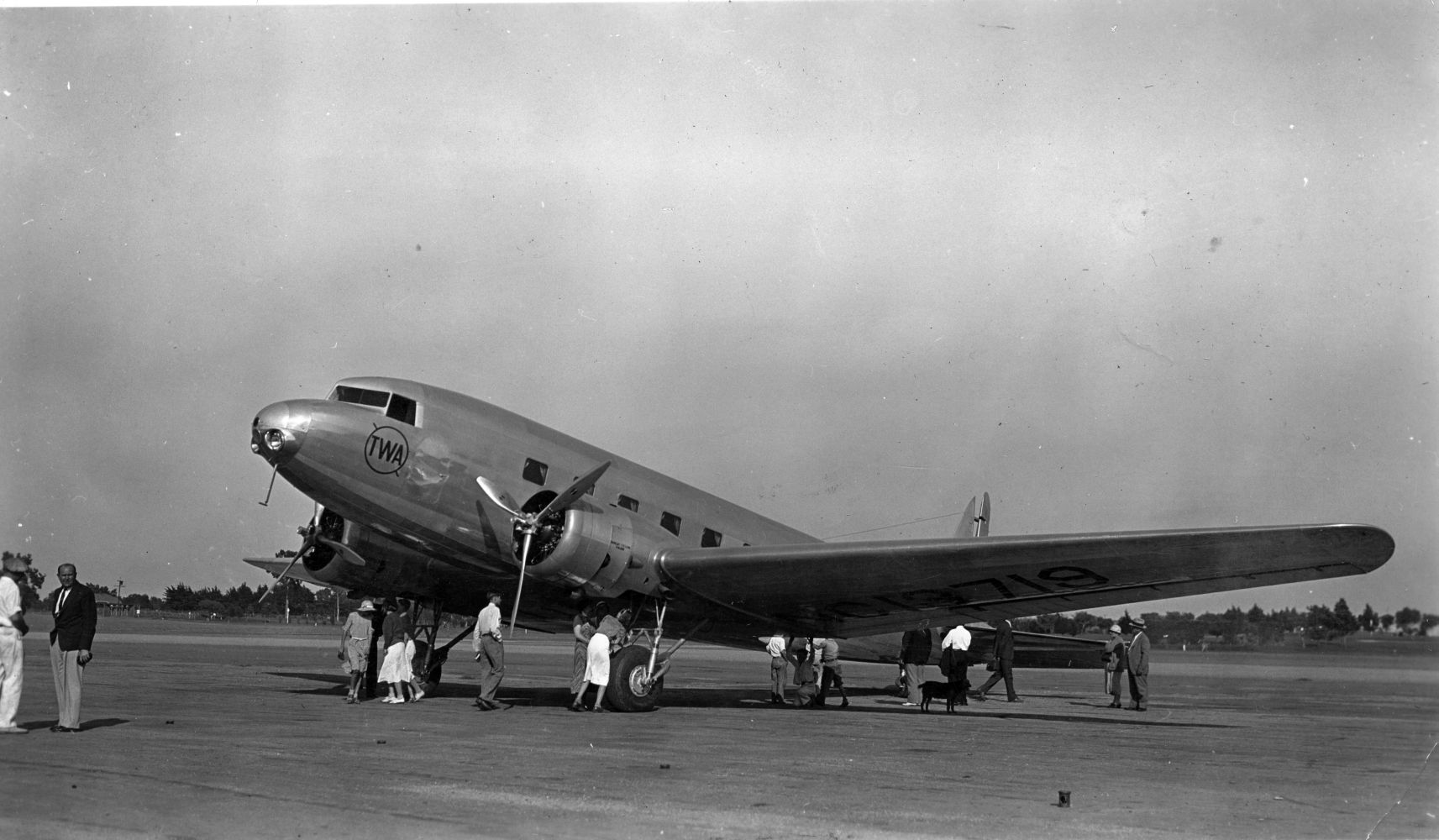
- A TWA DC-2, similar to the aircraft involved

Accident
- Date: March 1, 1938
- Summary: Controlled flight into terrain in severe weather
- Site: Yosemite National Park, Madera County, near Wawona, California

Aircraft
- Aircraft type: Douglas DC-2
- Operator: Transcontinental & Western Air
- Registration: NC13789
- Flight origin: San Francisco, California
- Destination: Winslow, Arizona
- Occupants: 9
- Passengers: 6
- Crew: 3
- Fatalities: 9
- Survivors: 0

The crash of TWA Flight 8 involved a Transcontinental & Western Air Douglas DC-2. On March 1, 1938, during a scheduled passenger flight from San Francisco to Winslow, Arizona, TWA's interstate hub, the flight encountered severe weather. The pilot radioed his intention to land in nearby Fresno. The aircraft subsequently crashed on a mountain in Yosemite National Park, and was found three months later.

== Flight ==
The aircraft was TWA plane #327 AC-III, NC13789, a twin-engine Douglas Aircraft Corporation DC-2-112 piloted by Captain John Graves, a former Army Air Corps pilot who won some measure of fame in 1932 when he located and dropped food to a group of snowbound people in northern Arizona. Crew members on board were the co-pilot, First Officer C. W. Wallace, and stewardess Martha Mae Wilson.

Flight 8 was flying from San Francisco to Winslow, which was a hub connecting TWA's transcontinental Los Angeles-New York route. It departed San Francisco in conditions of good visibility, with a cloud ceiling between 6,000 and 7,000 feet (1,800 and 2,100 m), and had sufficient fuel to last until midnight. The accident report list the causes of the disaster as "a change in wind direction and a sharp increase in velocity, unknown to the pilot, together with the pilot's confusion as to his position with reference to the Fresno Radio Range station, which combined to bring about flight over mountainous terrain, ending in a crash at near his reported cruising altitude."

== Disappearance ==
Two hours after takeoff, the flight encountered a building weather front that developed into the most severe storm on the West Coast in 64 years. As the flight neared the Tehachapi Mountains near Bakersfield, California, Captain Graves noticed ice forming on the wings. He advised air traffic controllers, who ordered him to divert to Los Angeles due to the deteriorating weather conditions. Graves replied that he planned to divert to nearby Fresno due to local weather. At 9:28 PM, he requested a weather update; this was his last transmission received by air traffic control.

== Search efforts ==
Officials based their search area on the reports of Mrs. C.G. Landry, who was operating the Edison Electric Company power house on Huntington Lake, approximately 45 miles (72 km) northeast of Fresno. She observed the plane at 9:29 PM flying along the San Joaquin River at an altitude of 500 feet (150 m). The search was concentrated in the snow-covered Sierra Nevada mountains to the east of Fresno.

Severe storms that lingered throughout the week hampered searches for the missing aircraft. Pelting rain and heavy winds prevented the use of aircraft in the search, forcing searchers to rely on automobiles, which were unsuited for the rugged mountain terrain. Harold Bromley, the Fresno inspector for the Bureau of Air Commerce, told reporters that the "visibility in the Fresno area was practically zero" as a result of the downpour.

The general search involved both TWA and government officials, who drove to Fresno from San Francisco and Los Angeles to aid in the search. As days passed, Transcontinental & Western Air grew increasingly desperate to find the aircraft, and eventually offered a $1,000 reward (equivalent to $22,872 in 2025) to anyone who could locate the aircraft.

=== Hoax call ===
On March 2, 1938, the day after the flight's disappearance, Transcontinental & Western Air headquarters told reporters that it had received a message purporting to be from United Airlines offices in Fresno, which claimed that the missing aircraft had been found. The telephoned message said that the plane had been found approximately 20 miles from Fresno with "several passengers injured but everybody alive," as later reported in the Ogden Standard Examiner.

Upon investigation, however, the message turned out to be a hoax; the plane had not been found. An outraged TWA spokesman denounced the message as "one of the cruelest hoaxes ever perpetrated." Officials at United Airlines offices in both Fresno and San Francisco denied that their employees had been the ones to call in the hoax.

=== Discovery ===
Three months after the crash, the aircraft had still not been located. A private citizen, 23-year-old H.O. Collier of Fresno, began a personal search for the missing plane after interviewing numerous TWA personnel and studying charts of the flight path. In early June, Collier hiked into the snowy terrain northeast of Wawona, California, and discovered the wreckage of the aircraft on June 12, 1938. The crash site was located 32 miles (51 km) northwest of the area searched by investigators.

The aircraft was partially buried in the snow of Buena Vista Crest, within Yosemite National Park. Eight bodies out of 9 occupants were thrown from the plane. Only the body of stewardess Wilson was trapped in the wreckage.

Investigators speculated that the aircraft had been blown off course while attempting to divert to Fresno, and had subsequently lost radio contact. It appeared that the plane had sheared off the tops of pine trees while in a steep bank and crashed into the mountain 200 feet (61 m) below the summit.

Seventy-one years later, Bob Hoskin of Redlands, California discovered a collection of artifacts from the crash in a cedar chest at a yard sale. It included a collection of original crash scene photos, letters from family members & TWA Officials, the TWA $1,000.00 reward check stub, First Officer Salisbury's pilot cap, a detailed manuscript written by Collier himself about how he found the plane, and several rejection letters regarding his composition.

== Investigation ==
On June 13, 1938, after the discovery of the crash site of Flight 8, Daniel C. Roper, the Secretary of Commerce, named a special board to investigate the crash. As the members of the inquisitorial board made their way cross-country from Washington, D.C., the coroner ruled that the cause of death of the victims of the flight was "accidental."

== See also ==
- List of accidents and incidents involving airliners in the United States
- Trans World Airlines
