= Albury Post Office =

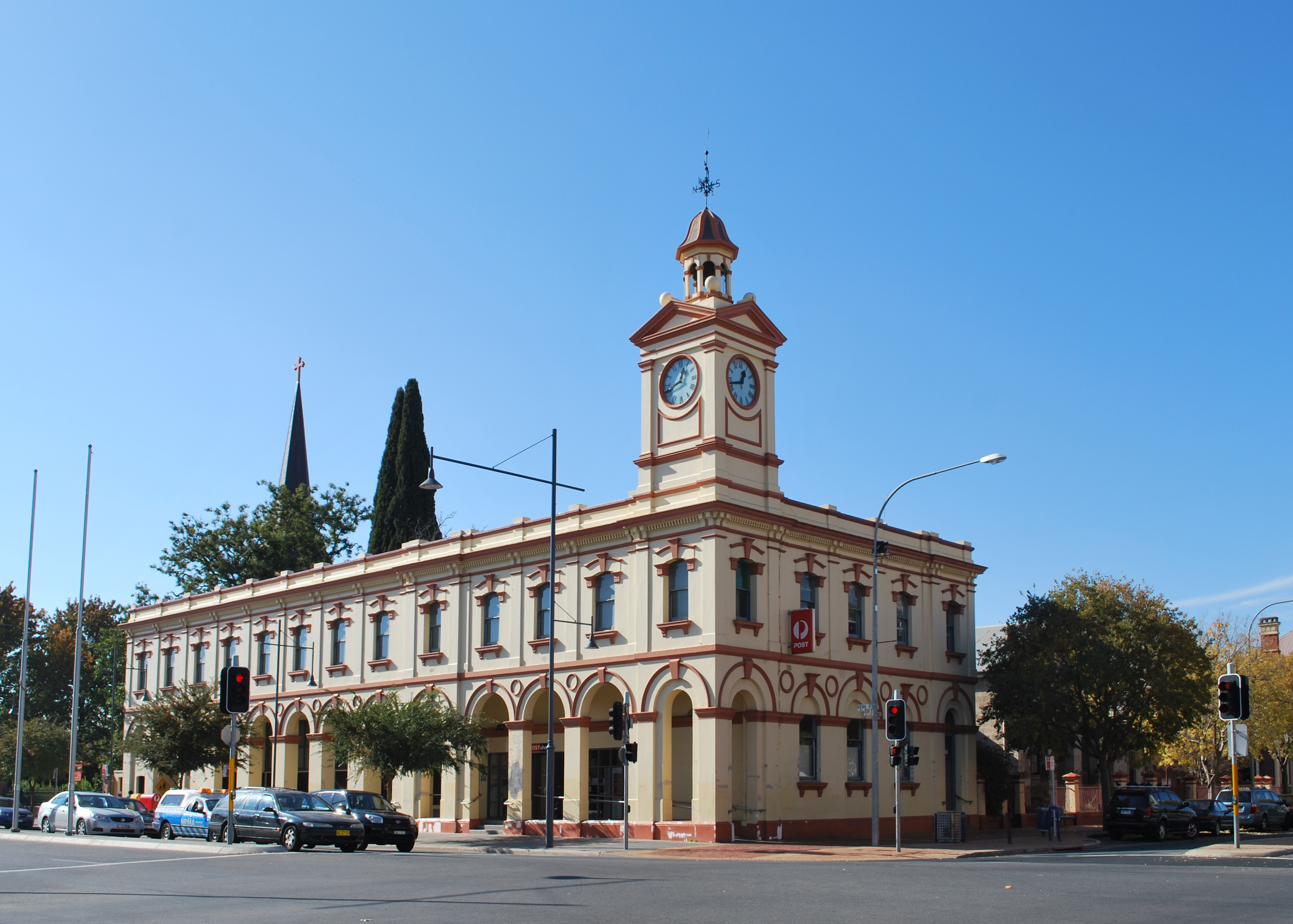
- The post office in 2010

- Location within New South Wales Location within Australia
- 36.0804°S 146.9160°E
- Location: 570 Dean Street, Albury, City of Albury, New South Wales, Australia

History
- Built: 1880–

Site notes
- Architect: NSW Colonial Architects Office under James Barnet
- Architectural style: Victorian Free Classical
- Owner: Australia Post

New South Wales Heritage Register
- Official name: Albury Post Office
- Type: state heritage (built)
- Designated: 17 December 1999
- Reference no.: 1311
- Type: Post Office
- Category: Postal and Telecommunications

Commonwealth Heritage List
- Official name: Albury Post Office
- Type: Historic
- Designated: 8 November 2011
- Reference no.: 105506

Albury Post Office is a heritage-listed post office at 570 Dean Street, Albury, in the Riverina region of New South Wales, Australia. It was designed by NSW Colonial Architects Office under James Barnet and built in 1880. The property is owned by Australia Post. It was added to the New South Wales State Heritage Register on 17 December 1999. On 8 November 2011 the building was listed on the Commonwealth Heritage List; and is listed on the (now defunct) Register of the National Estate since 21 March 1978.

== History ==
An electric telegraph station was erected at Albury in 1860. In 1878 the original part of the present building was constructed on the same site as the telegraph station. In 1904 the Post Office was amalgamated with the original telegraph office through substantial extensions along Kiewa Street. The clocktower was added in the 1920s.

== Description ==
A substantial Victorian Free Classical post office with an overall Palazzo form. The building is of two stories, constructed of stuccoed brick with moulded decoration. The ground level consists of colonnade archwork and the first floor of segmental arch window openings with exaggerated keystones, separated by pilasters. A truncated clock tower with cupola was added in the 1920s on the corner and designed similarly in the Free Classical style.

=== Condition ===
It was reported to be in good physical condition as at 1 July 1999.

The building has been substantially extended along Kiewa Street and the original loggia filled in and a clocktower added. The major additions respect the original design.

== Heritage listing ==
As at 1 December 1999, the heritage listing described the post office as a Victorian Free Classical country post office whose civic architectural character contributes to the historic Dean Street precinct. The listing also identifies the building as a prominent landmark at the entrance to the civic precinct and as significant to the Albury community's sense of place.

The building is associated with the NSW Colonial Architect's Office under James Barnet and it is part of an important group of post offices by Barnet.

Albury Post Office was listed on the New South Wales State Heritage Register on 17 December 1999 having satisfied the following criteria.

The place is important in demonstrating the course, or pattern, of cultural or natural history in New South Wales.

The building is associated with the NSW Colonial Architect's Office under James Barnet and it is part of an important group of works (including GPO, Sydney) by Barnet, a key practitioner of the Free Classical style.

The scale and distinctive architectural treatment of this post office (constructed 1878) reflect the importance of Albury once it became the Riverina railhead to the North East railway line in 1873.

The place is important in demonstrating aesthetic characteristics and/or a high degree of creative or technical achievement in New South Wales.

The civic architectural qualities of the country post office makes a significant contribution to the historic Dean Street precinct which includes the Town Hall, Court House and former Telegraph Office. The style, scale and height of the building make it a suitable "entrance" to the civic precinct. The strong addressing of the corner of Dean and Kiewa Streets makes the Post Office a focal point, endowing it with landmark qualities.

The Albury Post Office is an example of the Victorian Free Classical style. It is similar to other post offices at Orange (1879), Goulburn (1880) and Forbes (1881).

The place has a strong or special association with a particular community or cultural group in New South Wales for social, cultural or spiritual reasons.

As a prominent civic building in a historic precinct, the Albury Post Office is considered to be significant to the Albury community's sense of place.

The place has potential to yield information that will contribute to an understanding of the cultural or natural history of New South Wales.

The site has the potential to contain an archaeological resource which may provide information relating to the previous use of the site, and to use by the Post Office.

The place is important in demonstrating the principal characteristics of a class of cultural or natural places/environments in New South Wales.

The Albury Post Office is an example of the Free Classical style in a building with a palazzo form. It is also part of the group of Victorian Free Classical post offices (including GPO, Sydney) designed by James Barnet.
